= Addicted to Music =

Studio album by ATB
- Released: 28 April 2003
- Label: Kontor (Germany); Radikal (U.S.)
- Producer: ATB

ATB chronology
| Dedicated (2002) | Addicted to Music (2003) | No Silence (2004) |

Singles from Addicted to Music
- 1. "I Don't Wanna Stop" Released: April 2003; 2. "Long Way Home" Released: July 2003; 3. "Sunset Girl/In Love With the DJ" Released: October 2003

Addicted to Music is the fourth studio album by German DJ and remixer ATB. It was released in 2003 and includes songs such as "I Don't Wanna Stop", "Long Way Home", "In Love with the DJ", & "Sunset Girl". The first two were released as singles from this album, both with promotional videos, while the third was released as a remix-single, from The DJ in the Mix compilation.

The same year ATB also released his first DVD, Addicted to Music. The disc includes all his videos from 1998 to 2003 (excluding "Long Way Home"), a US tour documentary, interviews, lyrics, photos and the making of the "I Don't Wanna Stop" video.

== Track listing ==
Addicted to Music – Standard edition
| No. | Title | Length |
|---|---|---|
| 1. | "In Love With the DJ" (featuring Roberta Carter Harrison) | 6:46 |
| 2. | "I Don't Wanna Stop" (featuring Roberta Carter Harrison) | 3:35 |
| 3. | "Everything is Wrong" (featuring Roberta Carter Harrison) | 5:05 |
| 4. | "Long Way Home" (featuring Roberta Carter Harrison) | 5:18 |
| 5. | "We Belong" (featuring Roberta Carter Harrison) | 4:26 |
| 6. | "Gentle Melody" | 5:21 |
| 7. | "I Will Not Forget" | 4:58 |
| 8. | "Break My Heart" (featuring Roberta Carter Harrison) | 4:26 |
| 9. | "Sunset Girl" | 6:52 |
| 10. | "Do You Love Me" (feat. Roberta Carter Harrison) | 6:35 |
| 11. | "Peace = Illusion" | 4:33 |
| 12. | "Trilogy" | 3:35 |
| 13. | "Cabana Moon" | 6:15 |
| 14. | "Ruby" (The Wild Strawberries) (hidden track) | 4:07 |

Addicted to Music – Australia & New Zealand Enhanced CD 2
| No. | Title | Length |
|---|---|---|
| 1. | "9 PM (Till I Come)" (UK Radio Edit) (featuring Yolanda Rivera) | 2:43 |
| 2. | "9 PM (Till I Come)" (Signum Remix) (featuring Yolanda Rivera) | 7:33 |
| 3. | "Killer" (Video Edit) (featuring Drue Williams) | 4:05 |
| 4. | "Killer" (Lost Witness Mix) (feat. Drue Williams) | 6:15 |
| 5. | "Don't Stop" (ATB Radio Edit) (featuring Yolanda Rivera) | 3:49 |
| 6. | "Don't Stop" (Sash! Remix) (featuring Yolanda Rivera) | 6:02 |
| 7. | "The Fields of Love" (York Remix) (featuring York) | 7:31 |
| 8. | "The Fields of Love" (Public Domain Remix) (featuring York) | 6:03 |
| 9. | "Hold You" (Svenson & Gielen Remix) (featuring Roberta Carter Harrison) | 6:52 |
| 10. | "9 PM (Till I Come)" (video) |
| 11. | "Don't Stop" (video) |
| 12. | "You're Not Alone" (video) |
| 13. | "Killer 2000" (video) |

Addicted to Music – German Limited Edition DVD
| No. | Title | Length |
|---|---|---|
| 1. | "I Don't Wanna Stop" (Video In 5.1 Dolby Digital) | 3:42 |
| 2. | "US Tour" (Live DJ Set) | 2:26 |
| 3. | "ATB Addicted To Music" (DVD Trailer) | 1:47 |

Addicted to Music – Taiwanese VCD
| No. | Title | Length |
|---|---|---|
| 1. | "9 PM (Till I Come)" (video) |
| 2. | "Don't Stop" (video) |
| 3. | "Killer" (video) |
| 4. | "The Summer" (video) |
| 5. | "The Fields of Love" (video) |
| 6. | "Let U Go" (video) |
| 7. | "Hold You" (video) |
| 8. | "You're Not Alone" (video) |
| 9. | "I Don't Wanna Stop" (video) |

Addicted to Music – Polish Limited Edition DVD
| No. | Title | Length |
|---|---|---|
| 1. | "Complete Video Collection of All Hit Singles in Dolby Digital 5.1: "9 PM (Till I Come)", "Don't Stop", "Killer", "The Summer", "The Fields of Love", "Let U Go", "Hold You", "You're Not Alone", "I Don't Wanna Stop"" |
| 2. | "US Tour-Documentary" |
| 3. | "Private Photo Gallery" |
| 4. | "Behind the Scenes" |
| 5. | "Interviews" |
| 6. | "History" |
| 7. | "ATB-Quiz" |

Addicted to Music – US Special Bonus CD-ROM
| No. | Title | Length |
|---|---|---|
| 1. | "ATB Live In Chicago" | 41:04 |
| 2. | "DVD Trailer" | 1:40 |

== Charts ==
| Chart (2003) | Peak position |
|---|---|
| German Albums (Offizielle Top 100) | 8 |
| Hungarian Albums (MAHASZ) | 31 |
| Polish Albums (ZPAV) | 25 |
| US Top Dance Albums (Billboard) | 15 |
