= Seven Years: 1998–2005 =

Compilation album by ATB
- Released: 2005
- Recorded: 1998–2005
- Genre: Dance, trance
- Label: Kontor (Germany); Radikal (U.S.)
- Producer: ATB

ATB chronology
No Silence (2004)	Seven Years: 1998–2005 (2005)	Trilogy (2007)

Singles from Seven Years 1998-2005
- 1. "Believe in Me" Released: May 2005; 2. "Humanity" Released: August 2005; 3. "Let U Go (2005 Reworked)" Released: December 2005

Seven Years: 1998–2005 is a compilation album released by German DJ André "ATB" Tanneberger, in 2005. It contains all singles of ATB and six new tracks.

Three of the new tracks were released as singles: "Humanity" with vocals by Tiff Lacey, a reworked version of "Let U Go" with vocals by Jan Löchel and "Believe in Me" with Löchel on guitar and vocals. There is also a bonus DVD which includes all videos, a film documenting the "Making of I Don't Wanna Stop" and interviews. Commercially, Seven Years sold 18,000 units in Poland as of 2005.

== Track listing ==
Seven Years: 1998–2005 – Standard edition
No.	Title	Writer(s)	Length
1.	"Humanity" (feat. Tiff Lacey)	André Tanneberger, Tiff Lacey	4:23
2.	"Let U Go (2005 Reworked)" (feat. Jan Löchel)	Tanneberger, Ken Harrison	4:22
3.	"Believe in Me" (feat. Jan Löchel)	Tanneberger, Jan Löchel	3:14
4.	"Trilogie (Part 2)"	Tanneberger	4:09
5.	"Take Me Over" (feat. Nicole McKenna)	Tanneberger, Nicole McKenna, Saul Zonana	4:11
6.	"Far Beyond"	Tanneberger, RuDee, Woody van Eyden	3:14
7.	"Here with Me" (feat. Tiff Lacey)	Tanneberger, Bruce Elliott-Smith, Phil Larsen	3:36
8.	"Ecstasy" (feat. Tiff Lacey)	Tanneberger, Elliott-Smith, Larsen	4:34
9.	"Marrakech" (feat. Tiff Lacey)	Tanneberger, Elliott-Smith, Larsen	3:43
10.	"In Love with the DJ" (feat. Roberta Carter Harrison)	Tanneberger, Harrison	3:38
11.	"Long Way Home" (feat. Roberta Carter Harrison)	Tanneberger, Harrison	3:58
12.	"I Don't Wanna Stop" (feat. Roberta Carter Harrison)	Tanneberger, Harrison	3:32
13.	"You're Not Alone" (feat. Roberta Carter Harrison)	Tim Kellett, Robin Taylor-Firth	3:28
14.	"Hold You" (feat. Roberta Carter Harrison)	Tanneberger, Harrison	3:31
15.	"Let U Go" (feat. Roberta Carter Harrison)	Tanneberger, Harrison	3:25
16.	"The Fields of Love"	Tanneberger	3:41
17.	"The Summer"	Tanneberger	3:47
18.	"Killer" (feat. Drue Williams)	Tinley, Seal	4:01
19.	"Don't Stop!" (feat. Yolanda Rivera)	Tanneberger	3:47
20.	"9 pm ('Till I Come)" (feat. Yolanda Rivera)	Tanneberger	3:19

Seven Years: 1998–2005 – US Limited edition
No.	Title	Writer(s)	Length
21.	"Humanity" (Airplay Mix) (feat. Tiff Lacey))	Tanneberger, Lacey	3:47

Seven Years: 1998–2005 – US Limited edition DVD
No.	Title	Length
1.	"Marrakech" (video)
2.	"Ecstasy" (video)
3.	"I Don't Wanna Stop" (video)
4.	"The Fields Of Love" (video)
5.	"Hold You" (video)
6.	"Long Way Home" (video)
7.	"Let U Go" (video)
8.	"Killer" (video)
9.	"The Summer" (video)
10.	"Don't Stop" (video)
11.	"9 PM (Till I Come)" (video)
12.	"You're Not Alone" (video)

Seven Years: 1998–2005 – Europe and Asia Limited edition DVD
No.	Title	Length
1.	"9 PM (Till I Come)" (video)
2.	"Don't Stop" (video)
3.	"Killer" (video)
4.	"The Summer" (video)
5.	"The Fields Of Love" (video)
6.	"Let U Go" (video)
7.	"Hold You" (video)
8.	"You're Not Alone" (video)
9.	"I Don't Wanna Stop" (video)
10.	"Long Way Home" (video)
11.	"Marrakech" (video)
12.	"Ecstasy" (video)
13.	"Believe In Me" (video)
14.	"Humanity" (video)
15.	"Special ATB Access All Areas-Section feat.: Interview, Photos, Making Of, Bonus Video of "Believe In Me" (Exclusive Director's Airplay Cut)"
