= Dedicated (ATB album) =

Studio album by ATB
- Released: January 28, 2002
- Recorded: 2001
- Label: Kontor (Germany); Radikal (U.S.)
- Producer: ATB

ATB chronology
Two Worlds (2000)	Dedicated (2002)	Addicted to Music (2003)

Singles from Dedicated
- 1. "Let U Go" Released: May 2001; 2. "Hold You" Released: December 2001; 3. "You're Not Alone" Released: April 2002

Professional ratings
Review scores
Source	Rating
Allmusic	3/5 stars

Dedicated is the third studio album by German DJ and producer ATB. It features 12 tracks including three top hits: "Let U Go", "Hold You" and "You're Not Alone". The album was released in 2002.

== Track listing ==
Dedicated – Standard edition
No.	Title	Writer(s)	Length
1.	"Dedicated"	André Tanneberger	4:15
2.	"Hold You" (feat. Roberta Carter Harrison)	Tanneberger, Ken Harrison	3:31
3.	"Get High"	Tanneberger	3:59
4.	"You're Not Alone" (feat. Roberta Carter Harrison)	Tim Kellett, Robin Taylor-Firth	5:57
5.	"Halcyon"	Tanneberger, RuDee	4:00
6.	"Let U Go (New Version)" (feat. Roberta Carter Harrison)	Tanneberger, Harrison	3:30
7.	"I Can't Stand..."	Tanneberger	5:53
8.	"Hero" (feat. Roberta Carter Harrison)	Tanneberger, Harrison	4:24
9.	"I See It"	Tanneberger	4:25
10.	"Basic Love"	Tanneberger	7:27
11.	"I Wanna Cry" (feat. Roberta Carter Harrison)	Tanneberger, Harrison	4:23
12.	"Remember"	Tanneberger, Woody van Eyden	6:22

Dedicated – US bonus track
No.	Title	Writer(s)	Length
13.	"Hold You" (Todd Terry Extended Mix) (feat. Roberta Carter Harrison)	Tanneberger, Harrison	6:12

Dedicated – Japanese bonus track
No.	Title	Writer(s)	Length
13.	"Hold You" (Svenson & Gielen Remix) (feat. Roberta Carter Harrison)	Tanneberger, Harrison	6:35
14.	"Let U Go" (Wippenberg Remix) (feat. Roberta Carter Harrison)	Tanneberger, Harrison	6:39

Dedicated – US and Asia Limited edition (CD 2)
No.	Title	Writer(s)	Length
1.	"Hold You" (Svenson & Gielen Remix) (feat. Roberta Carter Harrison)	Tanneberger, Harrison	4:42
2.	"The Fields Of Love" (Public Domain Remix) (feat. York)	Tanneberger, Torsten Stenzel	6:01
3.	"Killer" (Lost Witness Remix) (featuring Drue Williams)	Adamski, Seal	6:07
4.	"9 PM (Till I Come)" (Bent Remix) (featuring Yolanda Rivera)	Tanneberger	2:58

Dedicated – US and Europe Limited Enhanced edition (CD 2)
No.	Title	Writer(s)	Length
1.	"Hold You" (Svenson & Gielen Remix) (feat. Roberta Carter Harrison)	Tanneberger, Harrison	4:42
2.	"The Fields Of Love" (Public Domain Remix) (feat. York)	Tanneberger, Torsten Stenzel	6:01
3.	"Killer" (Lost Witness Remix) (featuring Drue Williams)	Adamski, Seal	6:07
4.	"9 PM (Till I Come)" (Bent Remix) (featuring Yolanda Rivera)	Tanneberger	2:58
5.	"Hold You" (video)

== Charts and certifications ==
=== Charts ===
Chart (2002)	Peak position
Austrian Albums (Ö3 Austria)	63
Finnish Albums (Suomen virallinen lista)	22
Hungarian Albums (MAHASZ)	8
German Albums (Offizielle Top 100)	10
US Independent Albums (Billboard)	32
US Top Dance Albums (Billboard)	11

=== Certifications ===
Region	Certification
Hungary (MAHASZ)	Gold

== Personnel ==
- Bruce – artwork
- Roberta Carter Harrison – vocals
- Bill Platt – engineer
- Marc Schilkowski – cover photo
- Andre Tanneberger – arranger, producer, engineer
- Todd Terry – producer, remixing
