= Seven Years =

Seven Years or 7 Years may refer to:

- 7 Years (film), 2006 French drama film
- "7 Years" (Lukas Graham song), 2015
- "7 Years" (Superheist song), 2002
- Seven Years, a song from Natalie Merchant's album Tigerlily
- Seven Years (album), by Mark Mallman
- Seven Years: 1998–2005, album by ATB
  - Seven Years (1998–2005), DVD by ATB, released with the special edition of the album
- "Seven Years", a song by Level 42 on the album Guaranteed
- "Seven Years", a song by Norah Jones on the album Come Away with Me
- "Seven Years", a song by Saosin on the EP Translating the Name
- "7 Years", a song by Everlast on the album Whitey Ford Sings the Blues

== See also ==
- Seven Year Itch (disambiguation)
- Seven Year War (disambiguation)
- 7 (number)
