= Marrakesh (disambiguation) =

Marrakesh or Marrakech is a city in Morocco, North-Western Africa.

Marrakesh or Marrakech may also refer to:

== Agreements ==
- Marrakech Accords
- Marrakech Agreement
- Marrakesh Treaty (disambiguation)

== Media and entertainment ==
=== Music ===
==== Artists and labels ====
- Marrakesh Records, a UK indie label
- Marakesh (band), a Ukrainian alternative rock band
- Marracash, an Italian rapper
- Nass Marrakech, a Gnawa music group

==== Songs ====
- "Marrakech" (song), a 2004 song by ATB
- "Marrakech", by BWO from Halcyon Days
- "Marrakesh", by Giorgio Moroder from Giorgio's Music
- "Marrakech", by Hybrid from Morning Sci-Fi
- "Marrakesh", by Mina from Italiana
- "Marrakesh", by New Model Army from Impurity
- "Marakesh", by Tangerine Dream from Optical Race
- "Marrakech", by ZHU from Stardustexhalemarrakechdreams EP

=== Film and television ===
- Marrakech (film), a 1996 Dutch television film
- "Marrakesh" (The Apprentice), a 2008 television episode

== Other uses ==
- Marrakech (game), a board game
- Battle of Marrakech
- Abdelwahid al-Marrakushi
- "Marrakesh Express", a song by Crosby, Stills & Nash
