= Marrakesh in popular culture =

List of cultural examples

Popular culture references to Marrakesh (also called by its French name Marrakech), Morocco:

- Our Man in Marrakesh, which was released in North America as Bang! Bang! You're Dead!, is a 1966 British comedy film directed by Don Sharp, which starred Tony Randall and Senta Berger. It is an excellent guide to the tourist sites.
- "Marrakech" is a song by ATB on the album No Silence.
- "Marrakech" is a 2015 song by Israeli singer Riff Cohen.
- "Marakesh" is a Ukrainian alternative rock band.
- "Marrakesh Express" is a song by Crosby, Stills and Nash on their first album, released in May 1969.
- Marrakech Express is a 1989 Italian film directed by Gabriele Salvatores.
- Alfred Hitchcock filmed the opening scenes of The Man Who Knew Too Much (1956) on location in Marrakesh with Doris Day and James Stewart.
- The book Hideous Kinky, as well as its movie adaptation, are for a large part situated in Marrakesh in the early 1970s.
- "Marrakech" is a title of a chapter, as well as the chapter's main setting, in James Michener's 1971 novel The Drifters.
- "Going to Marrakech" is a song written by The Extra Glenns''s album Martial Arts Weekend.
- "Marrakech" is a track from Hybrid's 2003 album Morning Sci-Fi.
- "Marrakesh Night Market" is a song from the album The Mask and Mirror, recorded and released by Loreena McKennitt.
- German hip hop band Ancient Astronauts released a song titled "Lost in Marrakesh" as part of their 2009 album We Are to Answer.
- The Venture Bros. episode "Mid-Life Chrysalis" begins with the team waylaid on their trip to Marrakesh where they are to fight an army of giant mutated lizards.
- The Absolutely Fabulous episode "Morocco" takes place in Marrakesh.
- "Marrakesh" is a track from DJ Greyboy's 2001 album Mastered the Art.
- Derren Brown transported a subject to Marrakesh without his knowledge or prior warning for episode 1 of the first series of his television show, Trick or Treat, which was broadcast in April 2007.
- A map featuring Marrakesh exists for the video game Wolfenstein: Enemy Territory.
- "Marrakech" is a short essay written by George Orwell and published in 1939.
- In the William Gibson short story "New Rose Hotel", the narrator and Fox purchase "an old heroin lab that had been converted to the extraction of pheromones" for the purpose of providing a lab for Hiroshi in the old city of Marrakesh, the Medina.
- In a segment of The Simpsons episode "Treehouse of Horror II", Marrakesh is where Homer buys a monkey's paw that grants wishes, based on The Monkey's Paw by W. W. Jacobs.
- "Marrakesh" is a track by New Model Army from their 1990 album Impurity.
- "Die Stimmen von Marrakesch", whose title translates as "The voices of Marrakech", is a non-fiction work by Nobel Prize-winning author Elias Canetti, in which he describes his experiences in Marrakesh.
- Marrakesh is the national destination of Cycle 16 of America's Next Top Model.
- In the video game Payday 2, Bain states that the only place to sell artifacts is Marrakesh.
- Marrakesh is the setting of the third episode of the 2016 video game Hitman.
- A board game about trading carpets is set in and named after Marrakesh.

== Films set in Marrakesh ==
- 1956: The Man Who Knew Too Much — Alfred Hitchcock
- 1964: Cent mille dollars au soleil — Henri Verneuil
- 1970: Le Lit de la Vierge — Philippe Garrel
- 1998: Marrakech Express — Gabriele Salvatores and Gillies MacKinnon
- 2004: Abdou chez les Almohades — Said Naciri
- 2007: Kandisha — Jérôme Cohen-Olivar
- 2009: L'Arnacœur — Pascal Chaumeil
- 2010: Sex and the City 2 — Michael Patrick King
- 2010: La Source des femmes — Radu Mihaileanu
- 2010: Prince of Persia: The Sands of Time — Mike Newell
- 2019: Men in Black: International — F. Gary Gray
