= Two Worlds (ATB album) =

Studio album by ATB
- Released: 6 November 2000
- Recorded: 1999–2000
- Label: Kontor (Germany); Radikal (US)
- Producer: ATB

ATB chronology
Movin' Melodies (1999)	Two Worlds (2000)	Dedicated (2002)

Singles from Two Worlds
- 1. "The Summer" Released: June 2000; 2. "The Fields of Love" Released: October 2000

Two Worlds is the second studio album and the full-length LP from German DJ André "ATB" Tanneberger.

Two Worlds is a 2CD concept album from ATB released 31 Oct 2000. CD1 is titled The World of Movement and CD2 is titled The Relaxing World. Two Worlds gave ATB the opportunity to work with several others artists including Heather Nova, York, Enigma and Roberta Carter Harrison of the Wild Strawberries. ATB is a big fan of Michael Cretu a.k.a. Enigma. Roberta and Ken Harrison are behind some of ATB's biggest hits and the collaboration between ATB and the Harrisons is the biggest in the ATB music archive.

As with Movin' Melodies, Two Worlds was released by Kontor Records (Germany) and Radikal Records (USA). Edel Records (Club Tools) took on the release of Two Worlds.

== Track listing ==
Disc 1: The World of Movement
No.	Title	Writer(s)	Length
1.	"See U Again"	André Tanneberger	6:35
2.	"Love Will Find You" (with Heather Nova)	Tanneberger, Heather Nova	5:50
3.	"The Summer"	Tanneberger	3:39
4.	"Loose the Gravity"	Tanneberger	6:39
5.	"Feel You Like a River" (with Heather Nova)	Tanneberger, Heather Nova	3:48
6.	"The Fields of Love" (featuring York)	Tanneberger, Torsten Stenzel	3:44
7.	"Let You Go" (with The Wild Strawberries)	Tanneberger, Ken Harrison, Robert Michaels	3:54
8.	"Bring It Back"	Tanneberger	4:52
9.	"Hypnotic Beach"	Tanneberger	5:46
10.	"Fall Asleep"	Tanneberger, Marcus Loeber	5:05
11.	"Klangwelt"	Tanneberger	7:17

Disc 2: The Relaxing World
No.	Title	Writer(s)	Length
1.	"First Love"	Tanneberger	6:21
2.	"Feel You"	Tanneberger	3:58
3.	"The Summer (Ibiza Influence Version)"	Tanneberger	5:19
4.	"Engrossing Moments"	Tanneberger	3:41
5.	"Timeless"	Tanneberger	4:54
6.	"Repulse"	Tanneberger	2:31
7.	"Enigmatic Encounter" (with Enigma)	Tanneberger, Michael Cretu	4:39
8.	"Sensuality"	Tanneberger	3:53
9.	"Endless Silence"	Tanneberger	4:05

== Charts ==
Chart performance for Two Worlds
Chart (2000)	Peak position
German Albums (Offizielle Top 100)	45
UK Independent Albums (OCC)	34
US Heatseekers Albums (Billboard)	45
US Independent Albums (Billboard)	31
