= Trilogy (ATB album) =

Studio album by ATB
- Released: April 27, 2007
- Recorded: 2006–2007
- Genre: Electronica, alternative dance, synthpop, trance
- Label: Kontor (Germany); Radikal (U.S.); Avex Asia (Hong Kong, Taiwan)
- Producer: ATB

ATB chronology
Seven Years: 1998-2005 (2005)	Trilogy (2007)	Future Memories (2009)

Singles from Trilogy
- 1. "Renegade" Released: April 2007; 2. "Feel Alive" Released: July 2007; 3. "Justify" Released: December 2007

Trilogy is the sixth studio album by German artist ATB, released in Europe on 27 April 2007 and in the U.S. on 22 May 2007.

This album was made with a similar concept as ATB's second album, Two Worlds (2000), which is a two-disc album based upon different types of music for different moods. The first CD featured mainly up-tempo songs, while the second CD provided ambient and down-tempo songs.

The normal version of Trilogy includes only the first disc, which has a feel similar to that of ATB's older albums though with a slightly more rock/pop-oriented sound than his previous efforts, while the second disc, included only in the limited version, has a much more ambient feel, similar to some other trance music artists.

== Track listing ==
Trilogy – Standard edition
No.	Title	Writer(s)	Length
1.	"Justify" (feat. Jennifer Karr)	André Tanneberger, Alexander Perls, Jennifer Karr	3:47
2.	"Desperate Religion" (feat. Karen Ires)	Tanneberger, Pearls	4:37
3.	"Renegade" (feat. Heather Nova)	Tanneberger, Heather Nova	5:36
4.	"Beautiful Worlds"	Tanneberger, Rudi Dittmann	5:07
5.	"Stars Come Out" (feat. Heather Nova)	Tanneberger, Nova	3:27
6.	"Feel Alive" (feat. Jan Löchel)	Tanneberger, Jan Löchel	3:44
7.	"Made of Glass" (feat. Heather Nova)	Tanneberger, Nova	4:18
8.	"Alcarda"	Tanneberger	4:58
9.	"These Days" (feat. Jeppe Riddervold)	Tanneberger, Jeppe Riddervold, Mats Madestam, Peter Honoré	5:34
10.	"Better Give Up" (feat. Jan Löchel)	Tanneberger, Löchel	5:08
11.	"Some Things Just Are The Way They Are" (feat. Jeppe Riddervold)	Tanneberger, Riddervold, Madestam	5:26
12.	"The Chosen Ones" (feat. Jan Löchel)	Tanneberger, Löchel	4:13

Trilogy – iTunes Bonus Track
No.	Title	Writer(s)	Length
13.	"Night Watch"	Tanneberger, Dittmann	5:12

Trilogy – Limited Edition (CD 2)
No.	Title	Writer(s)	Length
1.	"Searching For Satellite"	André Tanneberger	6:16
2.	"Fahrenheit 451"	Tanneberger, Rudi Dittmann, Jan Löchel	4:26
3.	"Trilogy (The Final Chapter)"	Tanneberger, Dittmann	5:07
4.	"A Rainy Afternoon"	Tanneberger, Dittmann	3:45
5.	"No Fate"	Steffen Britzke, Mathias Hoffmann, Rene Swain	7:07
6.	"One Small Step"	Tanneberger, Thomas Wohlfeld	4:22
7.	"Dooley's World"	Tanneberger, Löchel	4:56
8.	"9 Am"	Tanneberger	5:20
9.	"Tristan Da Cunha"	Tanneberger, Löchel	4:16
10.	"A Dream About You"	Tanneberger	4:46
11.	"Illuminated Mind"	Tanneberger, Dittmann	6:22
12.	"Shine On"	Tanneberger	7:39
13.	"Under The Sky"	Tanneberger	4:20
14.	"One Million Miles"	Tanneberger	4:04

Trilogy – Polish Platinum Edition
No.	Title	Writer(s)	Length
13.	"Desperate Religion" (Cunningham Remix) (feat. Karen Ires)	Tanneberger, Pearls	7:52
14.	"Desperate Religion" (Egohead Deluxe Remix) (feat. Karen Ires)	Tanneberger, Pearls	7:05

Trilogy – Polish Platinum Edition DVD
No.	Title	Length
1.	"Wizyta ATB W Polsce - Z Prywatnych Zbiorów ATB" (video)
2.	"Na Planie Teledysku "Renegade" Oraz Wywiad Z ATB" (video)
3.	"Renegade" (video)
4.	"Feel Alive" (video)
5.	"Feel Alive" (Duende Cut) (video)

== Charts and certifications ==
=== Charts ===
Chart (2007)	Peak position
German Albums (Offizielle Top 100)	18
Polish Albums (ZPAV)	6
US Top Dance Albums (Billboard)	11

=== Certifications ===
Region	Certification	Certified units/sales
Poland (ZPAV)	Platinum	20,000^{*}
^{*} Sales figures based on certification alone.
