= Let U Go =

Let U Go may refer to:

- "Let U Go" (Ashley Parker Angel song), released 2006
- "Let U Go" (ATB song), originally titled "Wrong to Let You Go", released 2001
