= Ronski Speed =

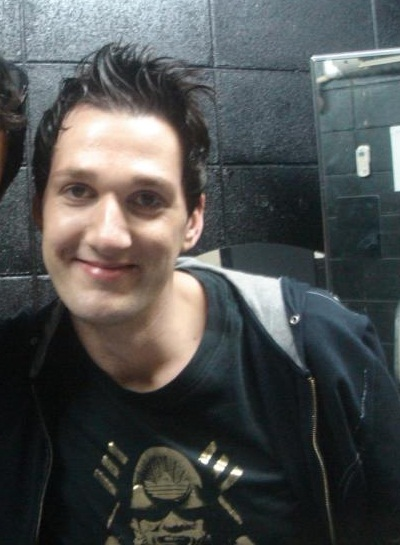
- Speed in 2009

Background information
- Also known as: Sun Decade; Shadowrider
- Born: Ronny Schneider; March 18, 1975 (age 51); Bautzen, Germany
- Genre: Trance
- Occupation: DJ
- Instruments: synthesizer, drum machine, personal computer
- Years active: 1997–present
- Label: Euphonic
- Website: Web Archive

Ronny Schneider (pronounced [ˈʁɔni ˈʃnaɪdɐ]; born on 18 March 1975), better known by his stage names Ronski Speed [ˈʁɔnski ˈspiːt] and Sun Decade, is a German electronic dance producer and DJ.

== Biography ==
Ronski Speed started his career as a DJ in 1997. Ronski Speed was influenced by groups and artists such as The Pet Shop Boys, Paul van Dyk, and Depeche Mode. Many of his most notable titles include: Ronski Speed - 2Day, Sun Decade - Follow You, Sun Decade - I'm Alone, Ronski Speed and Mirco De Govia - Asarja.

He is currently signed to the German record label Euphonic, where he has been since 1997, when the label was first established.

In 2003, his Remix of Aly & Fila's Eye Of Horus received huge airplay from the likes of Paul Van Dyk, Armin Van Buuren, DJ Tiësto and many others. The track was licensed to Fundamental Recordings in the Netherlands and reached number 4 position in the Dutch Dance charts.

In 2006 Ronski Speed performed all over the world in countries such as the Czech Republic, Poland, Hungary, Russia, the Netherlands, UK, Finland, Germany, China, Thailand, Taiwan, South Korea, Australia, New Zealand, Mexico, United States, Kenya, Canada and Singapore. Ronski Speed also has his own radio show, "Euphonic Sessions" and is broadcast on RMI Radio Poland, Sense.FM, DDance.FM, AH.FM, PureDJ.FM and ETN.FM.

Ronski Speed was ranked #69 in the 2009 DJ Magazine's Top 100. He was #97 in the 2008, #44 in the 2007 and #87 in 2006. Prior to that his only other entry was in the 2004 DJ Mag poll, where he came in 83rd as a New entry.

== Discography ==
=== Albums ===
- 2008 Pure Devotion
- 2013 Second World
- 2018 Evolve

=== Productions ===
- 2013 Ronski Speed feat. Emma Hewitt - Lasting Light 2K14
- 2012 Proton 12
- 2012 I Didn`t Know I Was Looking For Love (Ronski Speed with Stoneface & Terminal)
- 2011 Valle Verde (Ronski Speed & Kay Stone)
- 2011 Glueck (Ronski Speed & Cressida)
- 2011 U Got Me (feat. Emma Lock)
- 2011 To Be Loved (feat. Mque)
- 2011 Propane (feat. Filo & Peri)
- 2010 Lasting Light (feat. Emma Hewitt)
- 2010 Denva
- 2009 The Deep Devine (feat. Ana)
- 2009 Are You? (feat. Mque)
- 2008 All The Way (Ronski Speed feat. Aruna)
- 2007 Love All The Pain Away (Original Vocal Mix)/Kyau & Albert Remix) (Ronski Speed Feat. Julie Scott)
- 2007 Soulseeker (Stoneface & Terminal Mix/Ronski Speed Mix/DNS Project Remix) (Ronski Speed With Stoneface & Terminal)
- 2006 The Space We Are (Original, John O'Callaghan, Hydroid Remix)
- 2006 Incognition (Original, K-De & Marc Van Linden Remix) (Feat. Stoneface & Terminal)
- 2006 Have It All / Breath Of Life (As Sun Decade)
- 2005 Incognition / Drowning Sunlight (Feat. Stoneface & Terminal)
- 2005 Sole Survivor (Feat. Sebastian Sand)
- 2005 2Day E.P. (2Day / I.C. / The Lights)
- 2005 Asarja (Mirco De Govia Mix/Ronski Speed Mix) (Feat. Mirco De Govia)
- 2004 E.O.S. (UK Mixes) (Re:Locate/MK-S/Perry O'Neil Remix/Club Mix)
- 2004 E.O.S. (Club Mix/Positive Ways Mix/Perry O'Neil Remix)
- 2004 Follow You (Original/Kyau vs. Albert/Mike Shiver Remix) (As Sun Decade)
- 2003 Iris Original/John Askew Remix
- 2003 I'm Alone (Mirco de Govia Vocal & Dub Mix/Ronski Speed Vocal Mix) (As Sun Decade)
- 2003 I'm Alone (Mirco de Govia Dub Mix/Ronski Speed Mix) (As Sun Decade)
- 2000 Maracaido (Feat. Sonorous)

=== Co-productions ===
With Sonorous (singles)

- 2005 Protonic (UK Mixes incl. Leama & Moor Remix)
- 2003 Protonic
- 2002 Second Sun
- 2002 Second Sun (Mirco de Govia Remix)
- 1999 Facial...
- 1999 Inspirational Daylight
- 1999 Did You Ever Dream
- 1999 Electronic Fruits
- 1999 Glass Garden (remix not till 2000)

With Kyau & Albert (singles)

- 2003 Velvet Morning (Mirco de Govia Remix)
- 1998 Let Me In (Ole & Sven Remix)

With Mirco de Govia (singles)

- 2003 Final Emotion
- 2003 Dive In The Ocean
- 2002 Things That Matter
- 2002 Epic Monolith

With Barefoot Brains (singles)

- 2001 Remedy/Poison (with Barefoot Brains)
- 1999 Azure Fazure (with Barefoot Brains)

Others

- 2006 Blue Horizon (Luke Terry / Kenidel Lopez Remixes) (with Shadowrider)
- 2002 I'm Alone (Mirco de Govia Vocal Remix) (As Sun Decade)
- 2002 Massive (Mirco de Govia Remix) (with Ralphie B)
- 2002 Something (Mirco de Govia Remix) (with Lasgo)
- 2002 Shine (with Vivien G)
- 1999 Do What I Want (Shandy Remix) (with Moebius AG)
- 1999 Baywatch (Ole & Sven's Railway Remake) (with Spacewalker)
- 1998 U Got Love (with Ole & Sven)

=== Compilations ===
- 2009 Positive Ways 5 - Compiled and mixed by Ronski Speed
- 2005 Monster Series Volume 1 Germany
- 2005 Loveparade Mexico 2005 Compilation
- 2004 Positive Ways 3 - Compiled and mixed by Ronski Speed

=== Remixes ===
- 2015 Armin van Buuren feat. Mr Probz - Another You (Ronski Speed Remix)
- 2011 Tritonal feat. Meredith Call - Broken Down (Ronski Speed Remix)
- 2011 JES - Awaken (Ronski Speed Remix)
- 2010 Nitrous Oxide feat. Aneym - Far Away (Ronski Speed Remix)
- 2010 Cressida - Two-O-Ten (Ronski Speed pres. Sun Decade Mix)
- 2010 Andre Visior & Kay Stone - Sunrise (Ronski Speed Remix)
- 2010 DNS Project feat. Johanna - Mindful (Ronski Speed Remix)
- 2010 RedSound - Walking On The Beach (Ronski Speed Remix)
- 2010 Thomas Datt pres. Asedo - Seven Years (Ronski Speed Remix)
- 2009 Steve Brian - Yaya (Ronski Speed Remix)
- 2009 Dennis Sheperd - Black Sun (Ronski Speed Remix)
- 2009 Above & Beyond Presents OceanLab - Lonely Girl (Ronski Speed Remix)
- 2008 Super8 & Tab - Delusion (Ronski Speed Remix)
- 2008 Super8 & Tab - Delusion (Ronski Speed presents Sun Decade Remix)
- 2008 Markus Schulz - Daydream (Ronski Speed Remix)
- 2007 Juiz Electric vs DJ Katakis - African Beauty (Ronski Speed Remix)
- 2007 ATB - Renegade (Ronski Speed Remix)
- 2006 DT8 Project - Hold Me [Till The End] (Ronski Speed Remix)
- 2006 Carl B - Social Suicide (Ronski Speed with Stoneface & Terminal Remix)
- 2006 Hidden Logic pres. Luminary - Wasting (Ronski Speed Remix)
- 2006 Above & Beyond - Alone Tonight (Ronski Speed Vocal / Dub mix)
- 2006 Tatana ft. Joanna - If I Could (Ronski Speed Vocal / Dub Mix)
- 2006 Solarscape feat. Lisa Swain - Alive (Ronski Speed with Stoneface & Terminal Remix)
- 2005 Mystery Islands - Solace (Ronski Speed Remix)
- 2005 Marksun & Brian - Gran Rey (Ronski Speed Remix)
- 2004 Phoenixstar - The Example 60 (Ronski Speed Remix)
- 2004 Rusch & Murray - The Promise (Ronski Speed Remix)
- 2004 Kyau & Albert - Not With You (Ronski Speed Mix)
- 2004 Tatana ft. Jaël - Always On My Mind (Ronski Speed Mix)
- 2004 Armin van Buuren ft. Justine Suissa - Burned With Desire (Ronski Speed Mix)
- 2003 Miro - By Your Side (Ronski Speed Mix)
- 2003 Digital Tension - Symphony of Tomorrow (Ronski Speed Mix)
- 2003 Binary Finary - 1998 (Ronski Speed Remix)
- 2003 Goldenscan - Sunrise (Ronski Speed Mix)
- 2003 Aly & Fila - Eye of Horus (Ronski Speed Mix)
- 2002 Sonorous - Protonic (Ronski Speed Mix)
- 2001 Kyau & Albert - Outside (Ronski Speed Mix)
- 2000 Sonorous - Glass Garden (Ronski Speed Mix)
