= Tubular Beats =

Remix album by York and Mike Oldfield
- Released: 1 February 2013
- Recorded: 1972 – 2013
- Genre: Trance, downtempo
- Length: 1:16:39
- Label: Edel
- Producer: Mike Oldfield, Torsten Stenzel

York and Mike Oldfield chronology
Islanders (2012)	Tubular Beats (2013)

Mike Oldfield chronology
Icon (2012)	Tubular Beats (2013)	Moonlight Shadow: The Collection (2013)

Tubular Beats is a remix album containing collaborations between Mike Oldfield and York (Torsten Stenzel), that was released on 1 February 2013. Unlike previous club mixes, the album is a true two-sided collaboration between Oldfield and Stenzel, making use of parts from the original multitrack tapes as well as new parts played by Oldfield. Tarja Turunen appears on the track "Never Too Far".

It was released on the independent Edel label in Germany even though Oldfield is currently signed to the major label of Universal/Mercury. The album cover shows Oldfield's trademark Tubular Bells logo in blue/black on a white background.

A promo video for "Guilty 2013" was released by earMusic, which contains a shortened version of "Guilty Electrofunk Mix". In 2011 Moist Creations had released a screenshot from this titled "Guilty 2011".

The track "Tubular Bells 2 (Mike Oldfield & York Remix)" is, unlike the name suggests, not the remix of a track of the album Tubular Bells II, but a remix of the track "Finale" of the album Tubular Bells, in which a melody from "A Minor Tune" of the same album is incorporated.

== Track listing ==
No.	Title	Length
1.	"Let There Be Light" (York remix)	7:35
2.	"Far Above the Clouds" (York remix)	7:28
3.	"Ommadawn" (Mike Oldfield & York remix)	10:17
4.	"Guilty" (Mike Oldfield & York remix)	7:53
5.	"Tubular Bells" (Mike Oldfield & York remix)	10:40
6.	"To France" (York & Steve Brian radio mix)	3:35
7.	"North Star" (Mike Oldfield & York remix)	4:06
8.	"Moonlight Shadow" (York & Steve Brian radio mix)	3:32
9.	"Guilty" (York & Mike's Electrofunk mix)	4:53
10.	"Tubular Bells 2" (Mike Oldfield & York remix)	7:53
11.	"Never Too Far" (featuring Tarja Turunen)	8:47
