= Feel Alive =

Single by ATB

from the album Trilogy
- Released: July 27, 2007
- Genre: Electronic
- Length: 3:44
- Label: Kontor Records
- Songwriters: André Tanneberger; Jan Löchel
- Producer: André Tanneberger

ATB singles chronology
"Renegade" (2007)	"Feel Alive" (2007)	"Justify" (2007)

"Feel Alive" is a single released by ATB from his album Trilogy. It charted in the top 75 in Germany.

== Track listings ==
=== Feel Alive (CD single Release) ===
- 01. "Feel Alive" (Airplay Mix) (3:44)
- 02. "Feel Alive" (Sunloverz Edit) (3:55)
- 03. "Feel Alive" (Duende Remix Edit) (3:53)
- 04. "Desperate Religion" (Cunningham Remix) (7:53)
- 05. "Desperate Religion" (Egohead Deluxe Remix) (7:04)

=== Feel Alive (Vinyl Release Part 1) ===
- A. "Feel Alive" (A&T Original Club Mix) (9:18)
- B. "Feel Alive" (Duende Remix) (10:47)

=== Feel Alive (Vinyl Release Part 2) ===
- A. "Feel Alive" (Sunloverz Club Mix) (6:58)
- B. "Feel Alive" (Bee-Low Remix) (6:50)
