= Protect Your Mind (Braveheart) =

1998 single by DJ Sakin

Single by DJ Sakin and Friends

from the album Walk on Fire
- B-side: "Protect Yourself"
- Released: 14 September 1998
- Length: 3:38
- Label: Club Tunes
- Songwriter: James Horner
- Producers: Torsten Stenzel; DJ Sakin (Sakin Bozkurt)

DJ Sakin and Friends singles chronology
"Protect Your Mind (Braveheart)" (1998)	"Nomansland" (1999)

Music video
- "Protect Your Mind (Braveheart)" on YouTube

"Protect Your Mind (Braveheart)" (also known as "Protect Your Mind (For the Love of a Princess)") is a song performed by Turkish-German trance music project DJ Sakin & Friends. The vocal version features singer Janet Taylor. It peaked at No. 1 in Scotland and reached the top five in Denmark, Germany, Ireland and the United Kingdom. In 1999, it was included on DJ Sakin's first and only album, Walk on Fire. "Protect Your Mind" interpolates "For the Love of a Princess" from the Braveheart soundtrack, composed by James Horner. It was nominated at the 1999 Echo Awards for Best Dance Single.

== Track listings ==
12-inch, Italy
No.	Title	Length
1.	"Protect Your Mind" (Suspicious remix)	10:41
2.	"Protect Your Mind" (original mix)	8:24

12-inch single, Spain
No.	Title	Length
1.	"Protect Your Mind (Braveheart)" (vocal version)	3:38
2.	"Protect Your Mind (Braveheart)" (original version)	8:21
3.	"Protect Your Mind (Braveheart)" (Suspicious remix)	10:41
4.	"Protect Yourself"	3:19

CD single, Benelux
No.	Title	Length
1.	"Protect Your Mind (Braveheart)" (vocal radio mix)	3:38
2.	"Protect Yourself"	3:20

CD maxi, Europe
No.	Title	Length
1.	"Protect Your Mind (Braveheart)" (vocal version)	3:38
2.	"Protect Your Mind (Braveheart)" (instrumental version)	3:39
3.	"Protect Your Mind (Braveheart)" (Suspicious remix)	10:41
4.	"Protect Your Mind (Braveheart)" (original mix)	8:24

CD maxi (Remixes), Germany
No.	Title	Length
1.	"Protect Your Mind (Braveheart)" (Planet radio mix)	4:50
2.	"Protect Your Mind (Braveheart)" (Ayla remix)	6:55
3.	"Protect Your Mind (Braveheart)" (Van Bellen remix)	9:11
4.	"Protect Yourself"	3:20

== Charts ==
=== Weekly charts ===
Chart (1998–1999)	Peak position
Australia (ARIA)	18
Austria (Ö3 Austria Top 40)	20
Belgium (Ultratop 50 Flanders)	32
Denmark (IFPI)	2
Europe (Eurochart Hot 100)	16
France (SNEP)	15
Germany (GfK)	3
Ireland (IRMA)	2
Netherlands (Dutch Top 40)	21
Netherlands (Single Top 100)	33
Norway (VG-lista)	14
Scotland Singles (OCC)	1
Sweden (Sverigetopplistan)	23
Switzerland (Schweizer Hitparade)	15
UK Singles (OCC)	4
UK Dance (OCC)	1

=== Year-end charts ===
Chart (1998)	Position
Germany (Media Control)	42

Chart (1999)	Position
Netherlands (Dutch Top 40)	158
UK Singles (OCC)	73

== Certifications ==
Region	Certification	Certified units/sales
Germany (BVMI)	Gold	250,000^{^}
United Kingdom (BPI)	Silver	200,000^{^}
^{^} Shipments figures based on certification alone.
