= Renegade (ATB song) =

Single by ATB with Heather Nova

from the album Trilogy
- Released: April 13, 2007 : Germany
- Genre: Electronic
- Length: 3:58
- Label: Kontor Records (Germany)
- Songwriter(s): André Tanneberger; Heather Nova; Jan Löchel; Rudi Dittmann
- Producer(s): André Tanneberger

ATB singles chronology
"Summer Rain" (2006)	"Renegade" (2007)	"Feel Alive" (2007)

Heather Nova singles chronology
"Welcome" (2005)	"Renegade" (2007)

"Renegade" is a 2007 single by ATB, featuring Heather Nova, from his album Trilogy.

== Track listing ==
=== Renegade (Germany 12 single Release) ===
- 01. "Renegade" (A&T Mix) (10:16)
- 02. "Renegade" (Ronski Speed Remix) (6:26)

=== Renegade (Germany Promo single Release) ===
- 01. "Renegade" (Airplay Mix) (3:58)
- 02. "Renegade" (A&T Mix) (10:16)
- 03. "Renegade" (Ronski Speed Remix) (6:26)

=== Renegade (Germany CD single Release) ===
- 01. "Renegade" (Airplay Mix) (3:58)
- 02. "Renegade" (A&T Mix) (10:16)
- 03. "Renegade" (Ronski Speed Remix) (6:26)
- 04. "Renegade" (Video Clip) (3:58)

=== Renegade (US CD single Release) ===
- 01. "Renegade" (A&T short mix) (4:26)
- 02. "Renegade" (Ronski Speed remix) (6:25)
- 03. "Renegade" (A&T mix) (10:17)
- 04. "Renegade" (Airplay mix) (3:57)
- 05. "Renegade" (Original album version) (5:37)

== Charts ==
Chart (2007)	Peak position
Hungary (Single Top 40)	3
Poland (Polish Airplay Charts)	2
