= Believe in Me (ATB song) =

Single by ATB

from the album Seven Years: 1998-2005
- Released: May 30, 2005 : Germany; October 4, 2005 : US
- Genre: Electronic
- Length: 3:16
- Label: Kontor Records (Germany); Water Music Dance (U.S.)
- Songwriter(s): André Tanneberger; Jan Löchel
- Producer(s): André Tanneberger

ATB singles chronology
"Here with Me/IntenCity" (2004)	"Believe in Me" (2005)	"Humanity" (2005)

"Believe in Me" is a single released by André Tanneberger (ATB) from his album Seven Years: 1998-2005.

== CD single track listings ==
=== Believe in Me (Germany Release) ===
1. "Believe in Me" (Single Edit) 3:16
2. "Believe in Me" (Airplay Mix) 4:00
3. "Believe in Me" (Clubb Mix) 8:01
4. "Believe in Me" (A&T Remix) 7:23

=== Believe in Me (US Release) ===
1. "Believe in Me" (Single Edit) 3:17
2. "Believe in Me" (Airplay Mix) 4:01
3. "Believe in Me" (Clubb Mix) 8:00
4. "Believe in Me" (A&T Remix) 7:24
5. "Believe in Me" (DJ Antoine Main Mix) 6:58

== Charts ==
Chart (2005)	Peak position
Hungary (Dance Top 40)	23
Hungary (Rádiós Top 40)	31
