= Seven Years: 1998–2005 (video) =

Seven Years: 1998-2005

Compilation album by ATB
- Released: 2005
- Recorded: Unknown
- Genre: Dance; Trance
- Label: Kontor Records
- Producer: ATB

ATB chronology
No Silence DVD (2004)	Seven Years: 1998-2005 (2005)	Live in Poznan DVD (2006)

Seven Years (1998–2005) is a compilation album released in 2005 by German producer and DJ ATB. It was also released in a special edition with the Seven Years: 1998-2005 CD.

As the title says, the DVD features all his music videos from 1998 to 2005, a photo gallery, the making of the "I Don't Wanna Stop" video, an interview, and many more specials.

== Track listing ==
=== Videos ===
1. "9pm (Till I Come)"
2. "Don't Stop"
3. "Killer"
4. "The Summer"
5. "The Fields of Love"
6. "Let U Go"
7. "Hold You
8. "You're Not Alone"
9. "I Don't Wanna Stop"
10. "Long Way Home"
11. "Marrakech"
12. "Ecstasy"
13. "Believe In Me"
14. "Humanity" (Special Bonus Video "ATB in Concert")

=== Inside ===
- ATB interview

=== Gallery ===
- ATB photo gallery

=== Special ===
- ATB - The Making of "I Don't Wanna Stop" video

=== Bonus ===
- Bonus Video - "Believe In Me" (Airplay Version)
