= Bet You Think I'm Lonely =

Studio album by Wild Strawberries
- Released: 1994
- Recorded: The Chapel and MDI Studios
- Genre: Alternative rock
- Label: Strawberry Records
- Producer: Peter J. Moore and Ken Harrison

Wild Strawberries chronology
| Life Sized Marilyn Monroe EP (1993) | Bet You Think I'm Lonely (1994) | Heroine (1995) |

Bet You Think I'm Lonely is the third album released by the Wild Strawberries, and the only album released under the band's own label Strawberry Records. It followed the release of the song "Life Sized Marilyn Monroe", which also became a track on this album. It was originally released in 1994, and the band toured to support and promote it in 1995. It was re-released in 1998 by Nettwerk, with whom the Wild Strawberries had signed a contract in 1995. The re-release featured cover artwork that was not as dark as the original.

Notable songs which received airplay on Canadian radio include the title track, "Life-Sized Marilyn Monroe" and "Crying Shame".

The band was nominated in the Best New Group category for the Juno Awards of 1995 as a result of the success of this album.

== Track listing ==
1. "The Way It Goes" – 2:44
2. "Life Sized Marilyn Monroe" – 3:26
3. "Mannequin" – 3:41
4. "Bet You Think I'm Lonely" – 3:55
5. "Crying Shame" – 3:09
6. "Sweet" – 3:42
7. "Cinnamon" – 3:24
8. "Never Run to You" – 4:41
9. "California" – 3:47
10. "Everyone's Got the Blues on Sunday" – 2:57
11. "Angel Came Tumbling Down" – 4:38
