= Peace (York album) =

Studio album by York
- Released: 16 May 2006
- Genre: Trance, house, downtempo
- Length: 225:06
- Label: Offshore Music
- Producer: Torsten Stenzel, Jörg Stenzel

York chronology
Experience (2001)	Peace (2006)	Islanders (2012)

Singles from Peace
- 1. "I Need You" Released: 2004; 2. "Iceflowers" Released: 2005; 3. "Mercury Rising" Released: 2006

Peace is the second studio album by German electronica act York. The album is a mixture of trance, pop and Chill-Out. Even though York is commonly known for their trance and House tracks, this time the two brothers have changed their path. With Peace they are focusing more on downtempo productions, in order to describe and catch the atmosphere of their home island Ibiza. CD two features completely new remixes by renowned producers that represent the state of the art in the field of dance music; remixes by producers such as Roger Shah, Aly & Fila and Airwave.

== Track listing ==
No.	Title	Length
1.	"Farewell To the Moon (ambient version)"
2.	"Angels Will help You"
3.	"The Awakening (ambient version)"
4.	"Immortal"
5.	"Iceflowers"
6.	"Peace (feat. Jens Gad)"
7.	"I Need You"
8.	"The Reachers of Civilization (ambient version)"
9.	"World of Freedom"
10.	"Poesias"
11.	"Sundown (feat. Jens Gad)"
12.	"Moments in Love"
13.	"Mama (bonus track)"
