= DJ Taucher =

German DJ (born 1966)

Taucher
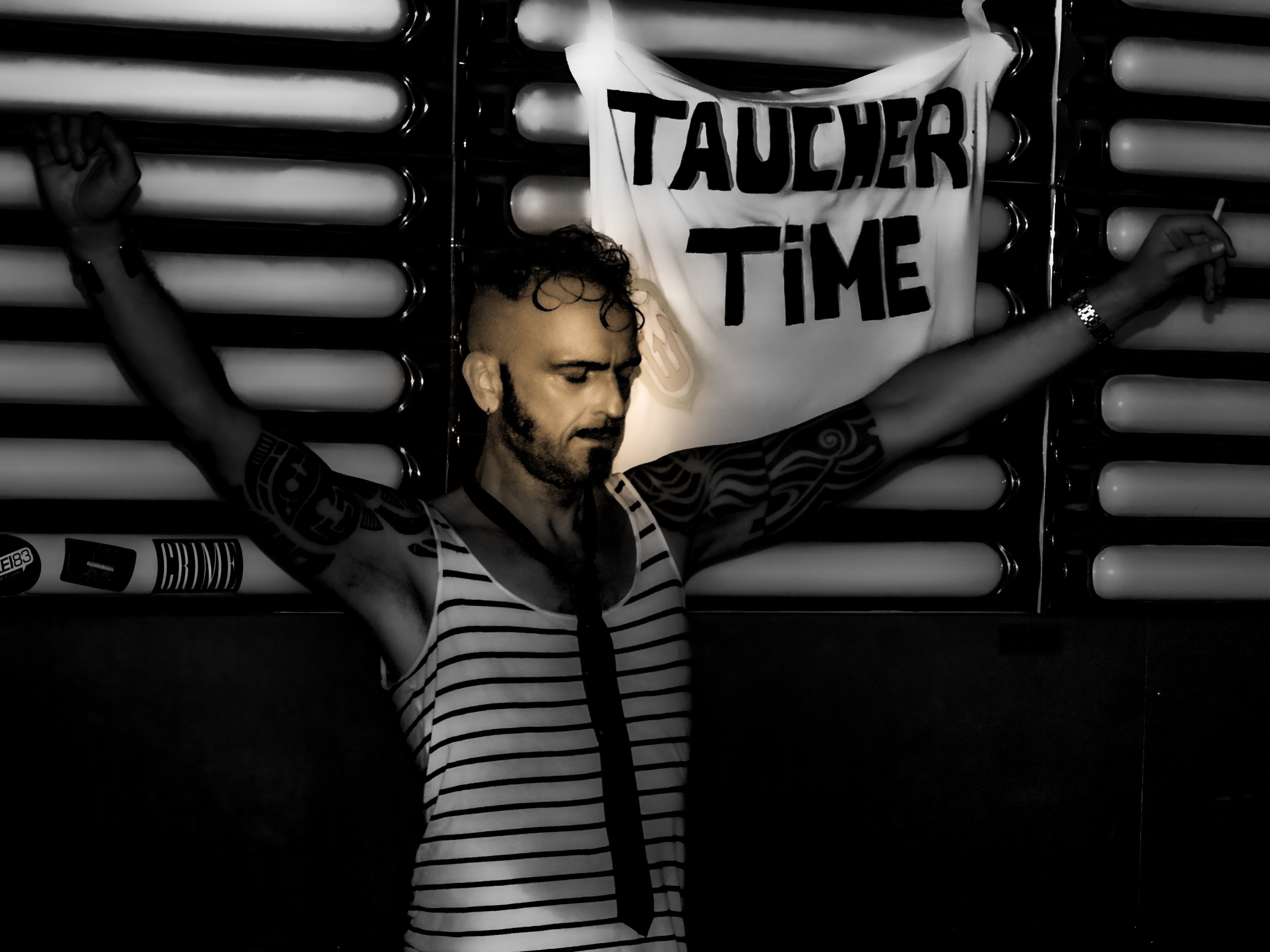
- DJ Taucher in 2013

Background information
- Born: Ralph-Armand Beck; 20 February 1966 (age 60)
- Origin: Mainz, Germany
- Genres: Trance, progressive house, deep house
- Occupations: DJ, music producer
- Years active: 1992–present
- Labels: Scuba Records, Planet Love Records, Zeitgeist (Universal), Dance Pool (Sony), Adrenalin (Sony), Adult Music, NoYu

Ralph-Armand Beck (born 20 February 1966), known professionally as Taucher (German for "diver"), is a German trance DJ.

Taucher began spinning in 1992, initially collaborating with Torsten Stenzel (1993–2003). He quickly became one of the best-known spinners on the Frankfurt club scene.

His 1999 compilation album Life Is a Remix was a success, as was his Live at Webster Hall, New York City, which peaked at number 43 on the US Billboard Heatseekers chart in 2000. His 1999 single, "Child of the Universe", peaked at number 74 in the UK Singles Chart.

== Discography ==
=== Studio albums ===
- 1996 - Return To Atlantis
- 2001 - Ebbe & Flut
- 2009 - Adult Music
- 2018 - Faces (with Tandu)

=== Singles and EPs ===
- 1993 – Atlantis
- 1994 - Fantasy
- 1995 - infinity
- 1996 - Waters
- 1996 - Miracle
- 1997 - Together (with Talla 2XLC)
- 1998 - Reach Out (with Mario De Bellis)
- 1999 - Bizarre/Child Of The Universe (Sanvean)
- 1999 - Nightshift (with Talla 2XLC)
- 2000 - Science Fiction
- 2000 - Pictures Of a Gallery
- 2002 - Millenium Bitch
- 2008 - Can't Wait (with Shane) (Part 1+2)
- 2009 - Just Like You (Part 1+2)
- 2009 - Mach Dich Mal Locker
- 2009 - Paris
- 2009 - Flow
- 2012 - The Rise Of The Phoenix (with Talla 2XLC)
- 2015 - Kings & Queens (with York & Ayla)
- 2015 - Free Yourself (with York & Ayla feat. Juno Im Park)
- 2018 - Skyarium (with Roger Shah)
- 2018 - Atlantis 2018 (with DJ Jo)
- 2018 - Konnection (with George Acosta)
- 2018 - Child Of The Universe 2018
- 2019 - Electric Dreams (with Talla 2XLC)
- 2020 - Berlin
- 2023 - Infinity (Patrik Humann Remix)
- 2023 - Rainbow
- 2024 - Atlantis (2024 York (a.k.a. Torsten Stenzel) rework)
- 2024 - Winterlove (Dreamy, 98 Mate & Torsten Stenzel Mix)

=== Vinyl and 12-inch ===
- 2003 - Patrick Scott & Taucher – Torched / Inexorable Lust
- 2003 - The More You Work The Better You Get
- 2004 - Taucher & Tandu Pres. Tantau – Mansonate
- 2004 - Taucher & Marc Vision Pres. ViTa – ViTa
- 2005 - Taucher & Zigon – Cuba Libre

=== Remixes (selected) ===
- 1996 - Scooter - I'm Raving (Taucher Remix)
- 1997 - Ayla - Ayla (Taucher Remix)
- 1997 - Sosa - The Wave (Taucher Remix)
- 1997 - Plastic - Addicted (Taucher Remix)
- 1997 - Legend B. – Lost In Love '97 (Taucher Remix)
- 1998 - Faithless - God is a DJ (Taucher Remix)
- 1998 - Blank & Jones - Flying To The Moon (Taucher Remix)
- 1998 - T2 - 8:15 To Nowhere (Taucher Remix)
- 1999 - DJ Hitch Hiker Pres. Lunatic Asylum – Meltdown 2000 (Taucher Remix)
- 1999 - Praga Khan - Injected With A Poison (Taucher Mix)
- 2000 - Trance Allstars - Ready To Flow (Taucher Club Mix)
- 2001 - York - Yesterday (Taucher Remix)
- 2003 - RMB - Your Love Is An Ocean (Taucher's Tribe Remix)
