= Experience (York album) =

Studio album by York
- Released: 12 March 2001
- Genre: Trance, Euro House
- Length: 111:42
- Label: Subversive Records
- Producer: Torsten Stenzel

York chronology
Experience (2001)	Peace (2004)

Singles from Experience
- 1. "The Awakening" Released: 24 April 1998; 2. "O.T.B. - On The Beach" Released: 23 July 1999; 3. "The Fields of Love" Released: 9 October 2000; 4. "Farewell to The Moon" Released: 2000

Experience is the debut album by German electronic act York. It features the hit singles Awakening, O.T.B. On The Beach, The Fields of Love (with ATB), and Farewell to The Moon.

== Track listing ==
No.	Title	Writer(s)	Length
1.	"Awakening (Still The Remix)"	J. Stenzel, T. Stenzel	5:06
2.	"Fields of Love (Dubmix)"	A. Tanneberger, T. Stenzel	7:20
3.	"Cover Me (feat. Ayla)"	J. Stenzel, I. Kunzi	6:41
4.	"OTB (On The Beach)"	Chris Rea	6:23
5.	"Hearts"	Oliver Lieb	7:47
6.	"Farewell to The Moon (Original 7")"	T. Stenzel	3:47
7.	"Kiss The Sky"	J. Stenzel, T. Stenzel	10:21
8.	"Heavy Mental"	J. Stenzel, T. Stenzel	6:44
9.	"Reachers of Civilisation"	J. Stenzel, T. Stenzel	7:09

CD bonus track
No.	Title	Writer(s)	Length
10.	"OST (On The Beach) (CRW Remix Radio Edit)"	Chris Rea	3:17
11.	"Awakening (Quake Remix Radio Edit)"	J. Stenzel, T. Stenzel	3:36
12.	"Farewell to The Moon (Watergate Remix Radio Edit)"	J. Stenzel, T. Stenzel	3:31
