= Jeppe Riddervold =

Danish songwriter and music publisher

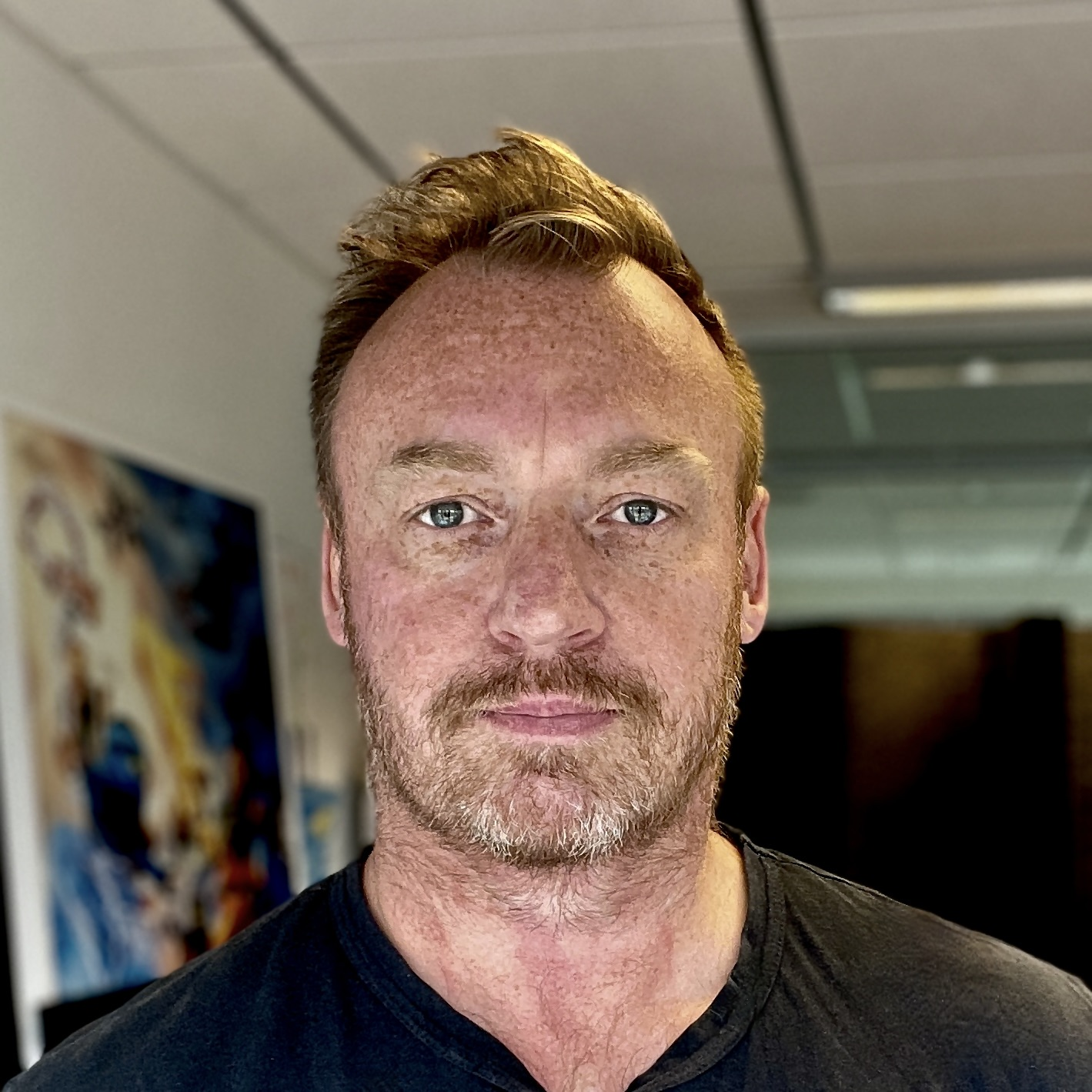
Riddervold in 2019

Jeppe Riddervold is a Danish songwriter, entrepreneur, and music publisher. He is co-founder and as of May 2024 CEO of JAM Company, and also founded Jelly Animation Sound Studios, a sound facility for animated works.

== Career ==
Riddervold was a songwriter with SonyATV/EMI music publishing in Nashville, Tennessee for almost a decade.

He was the musical director on the TV series Ninjago, an animated television series.

He is co-founder and as of May 2024 CEO of JAM Company.

In 2014, Riddervold founded Jelly Animation Sound Studios, a sound facility specialising in music production and sound design for animated productions. Riddervold is also the main stakeholder in Scandinavian publishing company, Glass Music publishing.

In 2016, he was a voice actor in Lego Ninjago: Day of the Departed.

== Awards and honours ==
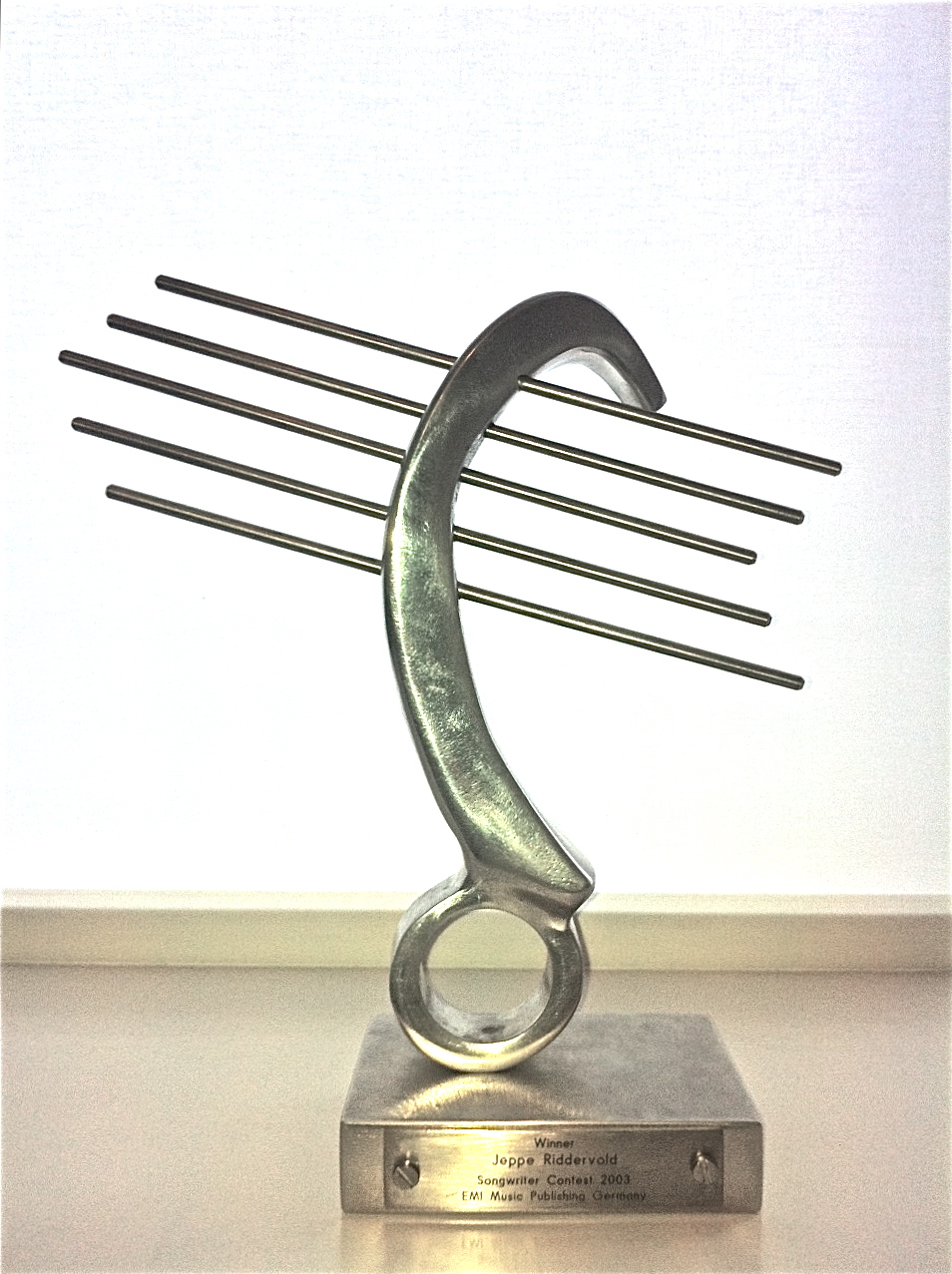
Riddervold's 2003 EMI Award

- Annie Award for Outstanding Achievement for Music in an Animated Television/Broadcast Production, for Ninjago (2014, nominated)
- BMI Music Award (twice)
- Emmy Awards (nominated in 2017 and 2020)
- EMI Germany Songwriter of the Year 2003 for the song "Survive", co-written with Bart Mendoza
