= Seven Year War =

Seven Year War may refer to:

- Seven Years' War (1756–1763), among European powers and their colonies, encompassing the French and Indian War
  - Great Britain in the Seven Years' War
  - France in the Seven Years' War
- Seven Years' War, an historical Spanish name for the First Carlist War (1833–1840)
- Northern Seven Years' War (1563–1570), also known as the Nordic Seven Years' War, Sweden against Denmark-Norway and allies
- The Seven Years War (game), a 1993 board game
