= Ecstasy (ATB song) =

2004 single by ATB

Single by ATB

from the album No Silence
- Released: 5 July 2004: Germany; 5 October 2004: US
- Genre: Vocal trance
- Length: 3:34
- Label: Kontor Records (Germany); Radikal Records (U.S.)
- Songwriters: André Tanneberger; Bruce Elliott-Smith; Phil Larsen
- Producer: André Tanneberger

ATB singles chronology
"Marrakech" (2004)	"Ecstasy" (2004)	"Here with Me/IntenCity" (2005)

"Ecstasy" is a song recorded by German electronic dance music DJ ATB, for his fifth studio album No Silence (2004). The track was released as the second single of the album on 5 July 2004, in Germany, and on 5 October 2004 in the US.

The song is characterized by its upbeat tone, crisp layering, and memorable intro. Vocals were provided by Tiff Lacey, who is also featured in the song "Marrakech". Ecstasy is among ATB's best known songs. It samples Jocelyn Enriquez's song "A Little Bit of Ecstasy".

== Track listing ==
=== Ecstasy (Germany CD single / Digital download) ===
- 01. Ecstasy (AT&B Airplay Mix) - 3:21
- 02. Ecstasy (Original Airplay Mix) - 3:36
- 03. Ecstasy (Clubb Mix) - 5:25
- 04. Ecstasy (A&T Remix) - 6:47

=== Ecstasy (US Vinyl single / Promo CDr Single) ===
- 01. Ecstasy (Clubb Mix) - 5:25
- 02. Ecstasy (Original Mix) - 3:36
- 03. Ecstasy (A&T Remix) - 6:47
- 04. Ecstasy (Chill In The Sunrise Mix) - 6:05

=== Ecstasy (Germany Vinyl single) ===
- 01. Ecstasy (Clubb Mix) - 5:25
- 02. Ecstasy (A&T Remix) - 6:47

=== Ecstasy (Italy Vinyl single) ===
- 01. Ecstasy (Clubb Mix) - 5:25
- 02. Ecstasy (AT&B Airplay Mix) - 3:21
- 03. Ecstasy (A&T Remix) - 6:47
- 04. Ecstasy (Original Mix) - 3:36

== Chart positions ==
Chart (2004)	Peak position
Austria (Ö3 Austria Top 40)	62
Czech Republic (IFPI)	19
Germany (GfK)	43
Hungary (Dance Top 40)	11
Hungary (Single Top 40)	2
Poland (Polish Airplay Charts)	2

== In other Media ==
- Canal 12 in Posadas, Misiones Used this as a Background song at the Top of the Hour.
