= No Silence =

Studio album by ATB
- Released: 24 May 2004 (Germany); 3 August 2004 (U.S.)
- Label: Kontor (Germany); Radikal (U.S.)
- Producer: ATB

ATB chronology
Addicted to Music (2003)	No Silence (2004)	Seven Years: 1998–2005 (2005)

Singles from No Silence
- 1. "Marrakech" Released: March 2004; 2. "Ecstasy" Released: July 2004; 3. "Here With Me/Intencity" Released: October 2004

No Silence is the fifth studio album released by German DJ and producer, ATB. It was released in 2004 and includes hits such as "Marrakech", "Ecstasy" and "Here with Me" (all featuring vocals by Tiff Lacey). These three songs were released as singles, with promotional videos for the first two. The first two singles were released from the album No Silence, while "Here With Me" was released from The DJ 2 in the Mix, ATB's second DJ mix compilation. The song "Marrakech" was used in the Mindhunters film. There is also a special edition album version, which includes a bonus DVD with remixes and videos. Unlike his other album releases, ATB used a cross fade effect on each song as a transition to the next song on the album with dream-like sequences and sounds of nature.

== Track listing ==
No Silence – Standard edition
No.	Title	Length
1.	"Marrakech" (feat. Tiff Lacey)	4:22
2.	"Ecstasy" (feat. Tiff Lacey)	4:21
3.	"The Autumn Leaves" (feat. Michal The Girl)	5:42
4.	"Here with Me" (feat. Tiff Lacey)	5:12
5.	"Black Nights" (feat. Madelin Zero)	5:02
6.	"Mysterious Skies"	5:30
7.	"Collides with Beauty" (feat. Madelin Zero)	5:49
8.	"Sun Goes Down" (feat. Ken Harrison)	4:07
9.	"After the Flame" (feat. Roberta Carter Harrison)	6:02
10.	"IntenCity"	5:26
11.	"Eternal Swells" (feat. Roberta Carter Harrison)	5:14
12.	"Wait for Your Heart" (feat. Roberta Carter Harrison)	5:16
13.	"Circular Symmetry"	5:38

No Silence – Polish Enhanced Christmas Edition
No.	Title	Length
14.	"Ecstasy" (Clubb Mix)	5:25

No Silence – Polish Enhanced Christmas Edition (CD 2)
No.	Title	Length
1.	"Here With Me" (A&T RMX)	7:40
2.	"Marrakech" (Revolution Mix)	9:16
3.	"Marrakech" (video)
4.	"Ecstasy" (video)

No Silence – German Limited Edition Bonus DVD
No.	Title	Length
1.	"Marrakech" (video)
2.	"Making of Marrakech and Interviews"	16:07
3.	"Photos"
4.	"Mindhunters" (the trailer)
5.	"Marrakech" (Alex M.O.R.P.H.'s Synthetic Empire Dub)	7:25
6.	"Marrakech" (Live @ Nowhere Mix)	11:30
7.	"Marrakech" (Alex M.O.R.P.H.'s Synthetic Empire Remix)	9:05

No Silence – US Edition Bonus DVD
No.	Title	Length
1.	"Ecstasy" (the video)	3:21
2.	"Making of Marrakech And Interviews"	16:07
3.	"Photo Gallery"
4.	"Making of Marrakech Picture Gallery"
5.	"Marrakech" (Alex M.O.R.P.H.'s Synthetic Empire Mix)	9:05
6.	"Marrakech" (Alex M.O.R.P.H.'s Synthetic Empire Dub)	7:24
7.	"Ecstasy" (Chill In The Sunrise Mix)	6:03

No Silence – Asian Edition (Disc 2)
No.	Title	Length
1.	"Marrakech" (Airplay Mix)	3:46
2.	"Marrakech" (A&T Remix)	8:36
3.	"Marrakech" (Clubb Mix)	11:18
4.	"Marrakech" (Live @ Nowhere Mix)	11:31
5.	"Marrakech" (Revolution Mix)	9:16
6.	"Marrakech" (Alex M.O.R.P.H. Synthetic Empire Dub)	7:25
7.	"Marrakech" (Alex M.O.R.P.H. Synthetic Empire Remix)	9:05
8.	"Ecstasy" (AT&B Airplay Mix)	3:21
9.	"Ecstasy" (Clubb Mix)	5:25
10.	"Ecstasy" (A&T Remix)	6:47

== Charts ==
Chart (2004)	Peak position
German Albums (Offizielle Top 100)	11
Hungarian Albums (MAHASZ)	27
Polish Albums (ZPAV)	8
US Top Dance Albums (Billboard)	15
