= DJ Sakin =

- Born: Sakin Bozkurt; 2 August 1967 (age 59); Turkey
- Origin: Germany
- Genres: Trance
- Occupations: Record producer, DJ
- Years active: 1990–present

Sakin Bozkurt (born 2 August 1967), known by his stage name DJ Sakin, is a Turkish-German trance music producer.

== DJ Sakin & Friends ==
In 1999, DJ Sakin broke into the mainstream charts with hit single "Protect Your Mind (For the Love of a Princess)". Following the success of this single, collaborations followed under the name with vocalists and artists as diverse as Vanessa-Mae among others.

== Discography ==
=== Studio albums ===
Title	Album details	Peak chart positions		
Title	Album details	GER	NOR	SWI
Walk on Fire	Released: 1999; Label: Club Tunes	71	8	23

=== Singles ===
Year	Title	Peak chart positions											Album
Year	Title	GER	AUS	AUT	BEL	FRA	IRE	NED	NOR	SWE	SWI	UK	Album
1998	"Protect Your Mind (For the Love of a Princess)"	3	18	20	32	15	2	33	14	23	15	4	Walk on Fire
1998	"Nomansland (David's Song)"	11	54	25	26	—	16	76	—	—	16	14	Walk on Fire
1999	"Dragonfly"	41	—	—	—	—	—	—	—	48	33	—	Walk on Fire
2000	"Reminiscing (Stay)" (featuring Vanessa-Mae)	—	—	—	—	—	—	—	—	—	—	—	Walk on Fire
2000	"Miami"	—	—	—	—	—	—	—	—	—	—	—	Singles only
2002	"I Still Can Hear Your Voice" (featuring Vanessa-Mae)	—	—	—	—	—	—	—	—	—	—	—	Singles only
2007	"Dirty Dancing" (featuring Nadja Benaissa)	—	—	—	—	—	—	—	—	—	—	—	Singles only
