= Marrakesh Treaty =

Marrakesh Treaty may refer to:

- Moroccan–American Treaty of Friendship or Treaty of Marrakesh, a 1777 inclusion of the United States in a list of countries to which Morocco's ports were open
- Marrakesh Agreement, a 1994 treaty establishing the World Trade Organization
- Marrakesh VIP Treaty, a 2013 copyright treaty on rights of users with visual impairments and print disabilities
- Global Compact for Migration, a 2018 non-binding United Nations agreement on a common approach to international migration, to be adopted at a conference in Marrakesh
