= Hold You (ATB song) =

Single by ATB

from the album Dedicated
- Released: December 3, 2001 : Germany; March 6, 2002 : US
- Genre: Electronic
- Length: 3:28
- Label: Kontor Records (Germany); Edel Records (Germany); Radikal Records (U.S.)
- Songwriters: André Tanneberger; Ken Harrison
- Producer: André Tanneberger

ATB singles chronology
"Let U Go" (2001)	"Hold You" (2001)	"You're Not Alone" (2002)

"Hold You" is a song by German DJ ATB, released as the second single from his third studio album Dedicated (2002). It features Roberta Carter Harrison of the band Wild Strawberries on vocals. It became a top 20 hit in Germany, Hungary and Romania.

== CD single track listings ==
=== Hold You (Germany Release) ===
1. "Hold You" (Airplay Mix) 3:28
2. "Hold You" (Clubb Mix 1) 7:13
3. "Hold You" (Clubb Mix 2) 7:25
4. "Hold You" (M.O.R.P.H. Mix) 7:59
5. "Hold You" (Ratty Mix) 6:51

=== Hold You (US Release) ===
1. "Hold You" (Airplay Mix) 3:28
2. "Hold You" (Tee's Radio Edit) 3:56
3. "Hold You" (Clubb Mix 2) 7:25
4. "Hold You" (Tee's Extended Mix) 7:59
5. "Hold You" (Ratty Mix) 6:51
6. "Hold You" (JN Remix Radio Edit) 4:13
7. "Hold You" (Clubb Mix 1) 7:13

=== Hold You (Netherlands Release) ===
1. "Hold You" (Airplay Mix) 3:31
2. "Hold You" (Clubb Mix 1) 7:19
3. "Hold You" (Clubb Mix 2) 7:25
4. "Hold You" (Svenson & Gielen Remix) 6:34
5. "Hold You" (M.O.R.P.H. Mix) 7:59
6. "Hold You" (Ratty Mix) 6:51

=== Hold You (Spain Release) ===
1. "Hold You" (Airplay Mix) 3:29
2. "Hold You" (Clubb Mix 2) 7:26
3. "Hold You" (Clubb Mix 1) 7:14
4. "Let U Go" (Clubb Mix) 8:18
5. "Let U Go" (Wippenberg Remix) 6:38
6. "Let U Go" (ATB Remix) 7:03
7. "Let U Go" (UK Dub Mix) 5:48
8. "Hold You" (M.O.R.P.H. Mix) 7:59
9. "Hold You" (Ratty Mix) 6:51

== Charts ==
Weekly chart performance for "Hold You"
Chart (2001–02)	Peak
Austria (Ö3 Austria Top 40)	39
Finland (Suomen virallinen lista)	14
Germany (GfK)	18
Italy (Musica e Dischi)	45
Hungary (Rádiós Top 40)	2
Hungary (Single Top 40)	5
Romania (Romanian Top 100)	13
Switzerland (Schweizer Hitparade)	86

=== Year-end charts ===
Chart (2002)	Position
Brazil (Crowley)	87
