= Torsten Stenzel =

German music producer

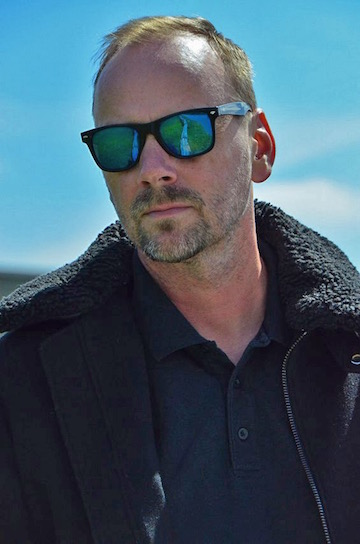
- Stenzel in 2017

Background information
- Also known as: York, Ace, Ace Cozmic, Charly Massive, DJ Scream, Happy Dreadlocks, Headbanger, Jack Daniels, Joint Brothers, Liquid Is Liquid, Savannam, Slide, Suspicious, Syntetic Sector, T.C.P., Tanzdiebe, Teschnozabel, One Man Ahead, Ethno Worlds, Outlanders
- Born: Thorsten Michael Walter Stenzel; 27 September 1971 (age 54)
- Origin: Bad Homburg vor der Höhe, Hesse, Germany
- Genres: Trance, house, techno, ambient, chillout, classical, lounge, pop, smooth jazz
- Occupations: Composer, record producer, songwriter, remixer
- Instruments: Organ, piano, synthesizer
- Years active: 1992–present
- Website: www.york-music.com

Torsten Stenzel is a German music producer, composer and Honorary Consulate of Germany. Classically trained from an early age, his roots are within the field of electronic dance music. His interest for music first started at age five when he received piano lessons by academic piano teacher Andre Terebesi. He is the father of the recording artist Au/Ra.

== Early life ==
At age 13, Stenzel began his training on the church organ and received his church organist diploma at age 15, graduating from the Protestant church in Frankfurt.

== Career ==
In 1990, he released his first single "Recall IV – Contrast" through ZYX Records. His partners failed to credit him as a writer/co-producer and because of his lack of knowledge of the music industry at the time, only "mixed by Torsten Stenzel" appeared on the credits.

In 1992, Stenzel became the A&R manager for the underground record label Crash Records. It was his first job in the recording business and together with his partner at the time, Zied Jouini, Stenzel became responsible for the label. Their first release "N.U.K.E – Nana" went straight to No. 1 in Italy and No. 3 in Benelux.

In 1993, Stenzel started his collaboration with DJ Taucher, who had weekly shows at the Music Hall in Frankfurt.

The first release by the duo was the single "Happiness", followed by the second single "Atlantis" in 1993 on Planet Love Records.

=== First label (1993–1998) ===
In 1993, Stenzel founded his own underground label Liquid Records. Together with fellow German producer Oliver Lieb, Stenzel started the project Paragliders. During this period, he kept working with renowned electronic artists such as Booka Shade, DJ Tatana, DJ Taucher, Talla 2XLC and DJ Sakin. Stenzel released over 40 vinyl singles through Liquid Records.

=== Taucher and Stenzel ===
In 1995, Stenzel bought the rights to Planet Love Records in which he had been the A&R manager. He was now focused on developing his trance sounds together with compatriot Ralph-Armand Beck (DJ Taucher). Their single "Fantasy" was licensed to Sony Dancepool and it reached a top 50 position in the German Media Control charts. The third single "Infinity" also reached a top 50 position in Germany.

Until 1997, the duo remixed over 52 artists and were named the 'worldwide third best remixers' by readers of the magazine Raveline. Stenzel and Taucher reworked tracks by amongst others Faithless – 'God is a DJ', which in several countries reached a number 1 position in the charts. The Stenzel-Taucher productions were also licensed by famed British producer and Dj Paul Oakenfold for some of his compilations. Furthermore, the duo also released productions under their alias' 'Red Light District' and 'Diver & Ace'.

=== Commercial breakthrough – DJ Sakin & Friends (1999–2006) ===
In 1998, Stenzel released the track "Protect Your Mind" together with producer Sakin Bozkurt (DJ Sakin). It was the first single under the new project 'DJ Sakin & Friends' and it was released through Planet Love Records.

They had produced a club version based on the film music by composer James Horner. Several European DJs played the track frequently and it quickly became a club hit. In 1999, Stenzel licensed the track to the underground label Overdose and produced a remix (Suspicious Remix).

Shortly after a single with the new remix was released it entered the German charts without a music video or further promotion. It became a fast selling item and after only one week it rose in the German music sales charts onto a number 3 position. In the German Dance Charts it hit a number 1 position, and additionally received Silver, Gold and Platin records in several European countries. It also reached number 4 in the UK charts in March 1999. Today more than 700.000 copies of 'Protect Your Mind' have been sold.

The second single from the duo – 'Nomansland' featured the melody of an old TV show that Stenzel loved as a child (The Adventures of David Belfort). 'Nomansland' reached a 10th position in Germany and 16th position in the United Kingdom. It was difficult to continue the achievements of Sakin & Friends after the runaway success of 'Protect Your Mind', but even their debut album 'Walk on Fire' charted successfully.
As a result of this success Stenzel decided to fulfill his dream and explore options outside of Germany. He moved to the Spanish Balearic island Ibiza and built a recording studio in his home close to San Jose.

=== YORK ===
After setting up the studio in Ibiza, Stenzel worked promptly on his different projects. Among these YORK that he had started in 1997 with his brother Jörg Stenzel. Their first single The Awakening reached an 11th position in the UK charts. It became the first trance track that had the electric guitar as lead instrument. With more than 250.000 sold copies 'The Awakening' became one of the best selling singles that did not reach a top 10 position in the United Kingdom.
Their second single 'On The Beach' was released on the German producer Andreas Tomallas' (Talla 2XLC) label – 'Suck me Plasma'. It was later on licensed to Sony Music Germany and Manifesto in The United Kingdom. 'On The Beach' was a conversion of British singer-songwriter Chris Rea. It instantly reached a top 3 position in Germany, United Kingdom and US. Stenzel had his second huge hit following 'Protect Your Mind'. Furthermore, Chris Rea was so positively affected by the conversion – which had sold more copies than the original from 1986 – that he helped promoting the track with a performance in the British 'Top of The Pops' show. Chris Rea and Stenzel started writing songs together, among others the track 'Your Love is Setting Me Free' by Watermen Meets Chris Rea.

=== Moby ===
Stenzel has been a huge fan of Moby, since the release of the album Go in 1991. In 2001 Moby's manager contacted him and asked if he would be interested in remixing the new single Porcelain along with Rob Dougan, Futureshock and Force Mass Motion. Stenzel produced a deep Clubremix, that later on was released through Mute Records (US). On September 13th 2024 all three Torsten Stenzel Remix versions of Porcelain were made digital available for the first time, as part of the digital back-catalog release of the 'Porcelain' single.

=== Ibiza projects ===
In 1999, after a short time in Ibiza, word of mouth spread and the biggest German music channel VIVA sent reporters to interview Stenzel. Local DJ's and producers in Ibiza welcomed him and he then met DJ Sin Plomo, who was a resident DJ in the Space-Club (We Love Sundays) and the well known KM 5-Club. They started an intensive collaboration and had numerous releases together on different labels. Among these they released a series of KM 5 compilation albums on Richard Branson's label Virgin Records. Additionally Stenzel worked with Sin Plomo's friend Paul Lomax. Together they produced two records Islands and Sweet Love – two typical Balearic sound tunes. Stenzel managed to get his Chillout Productions on the famous Cafe del Mar and Buddha Bar compilations. He also released an album and several singles in co-operation with DJ and producer Matt Caseli – resident DJ at Ibiza's most famous nightclub 'Pacha'.
- 2004 Stenzel met German DJ and producer Sven Greiner (DJ Shog) on Ibiza. Together they founded the record label '7th Sense Recordings' where they released various new trance projects under alias' such as Mandala Bros., Jolly Harbour and San Jose. During his time in Ibiza, he had his now extremely successful daughter Jamie Lou Stenzel, Au/Ra, who is widely known for her single 'Panic Room'.

=== Tarja Turunen ===
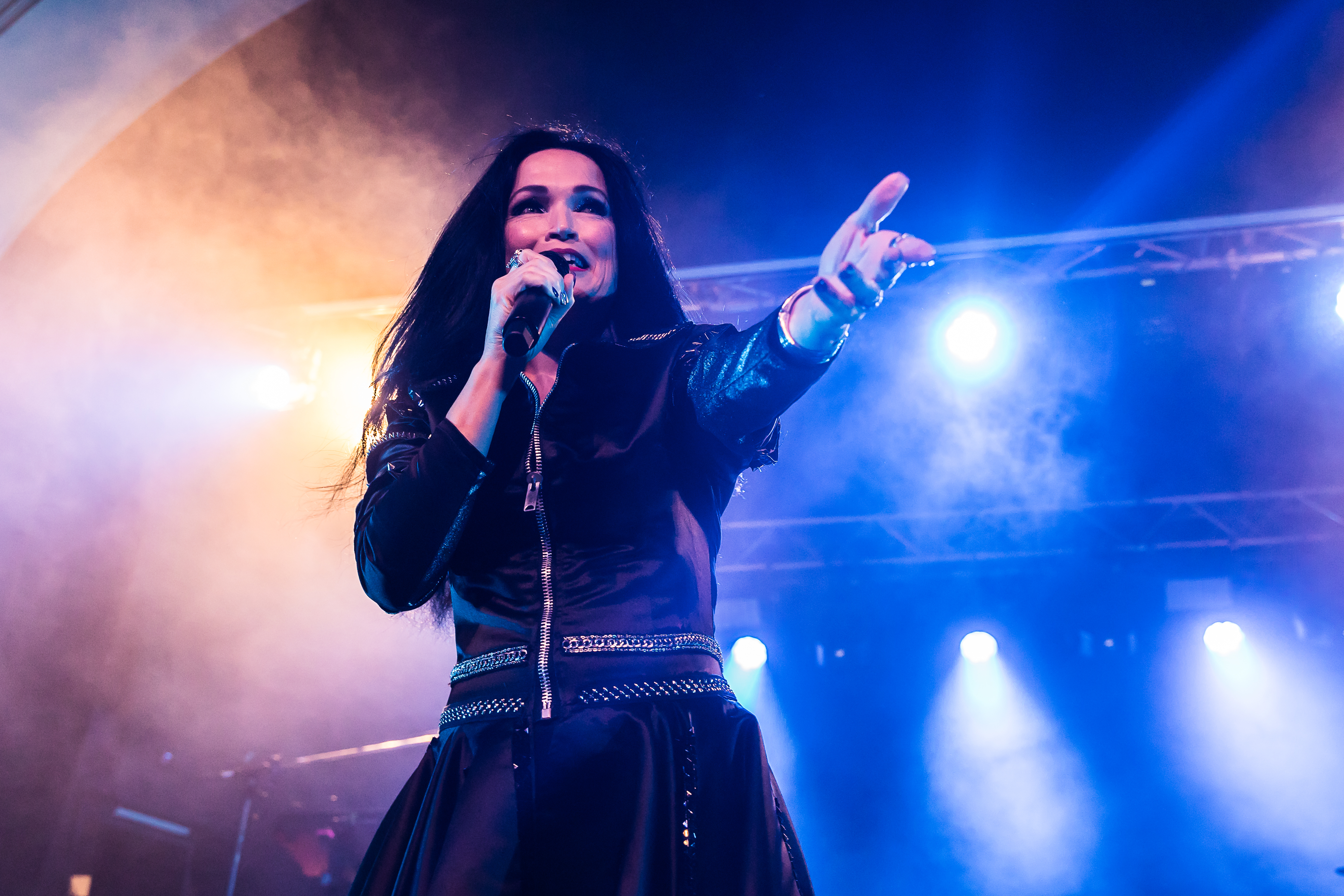
Tarja Turunen.

In 2006, the Finnish rock singer and ex-front figure of the rock band Nightwish was searching for new songs for her first solo album. Torsten's Kenyan songwriter friend Adrian Zagoritis pitched her the track Iceflowers, taken from the second 'York' album 'Peace' (2004). Tarja liked the production and was interested in writing music with Stenzel.
It was a music direction totally new for Torsten. Tarja had the idea to write her new album in Ibiza, and Torsten organized, together with the Berlin Department of Universal Music, a writing camp where they flew in 10 writers from all over Europe. They wrote about 75% of the songs on her debut album My Winter Storm at this session. Stenzel wrote 5 songs for this album of which 3 – 'The Reign', 'Damned & Divine' and 'Lost Northern Star' – were recorded in Santa Monica at the Remote Control Studios of Academy Award-nominee Hans Zimmer.
The album was released through Universal Music in 70 countries. It became a huge worldwide success and received several Gold and Platinum records in Finland, Russia and Germany. In 2010 Tarja released her second album What Lies Beneath. Stenzel wrote two tracks for this album; one of these being the song 'Naiad'. The album reached top 5 in the German sales chart.

=== Los Angeles ===
In 2006, Stenzel travelled to the US to promote the new album he produced with Jennifer Paige. He was introduced by Paige to musical genius and multi-Grammy winner, American Rick Nowels. After a short conversation Nowels wanted to hear the new songs produced with Jennifer Paige. He then asked Stenzel if he would be interested in playing keyboard for him as he was just completing new songs for the British girl band All Saints. Torsten eventually played keyboards on many of the songs including 'Chickfit', that was released as one of their 2007 singles off the album 'Studio One'.

=== Film music ===
Arriving in Antigua in late 2007, Torsten met the movie producer Rolant Hergert through an Antiguan friend. Rolant was shooting a new motion picture in Berlin called Fire. Torsten was invited to Berlin to score 'The Making of Fire'. After the producer heard his work, he replaced the original composer with Stenzel, who wrote the entire soundtrack in Antigua. Meanwhile, Stenzel made another soundtrack for a Caribbean documentary Vanishing Sail which won six awards, like the Caribbean Spirit award in 2015 .

=== Return of 'Planet Love Records' (2011–2019) ===
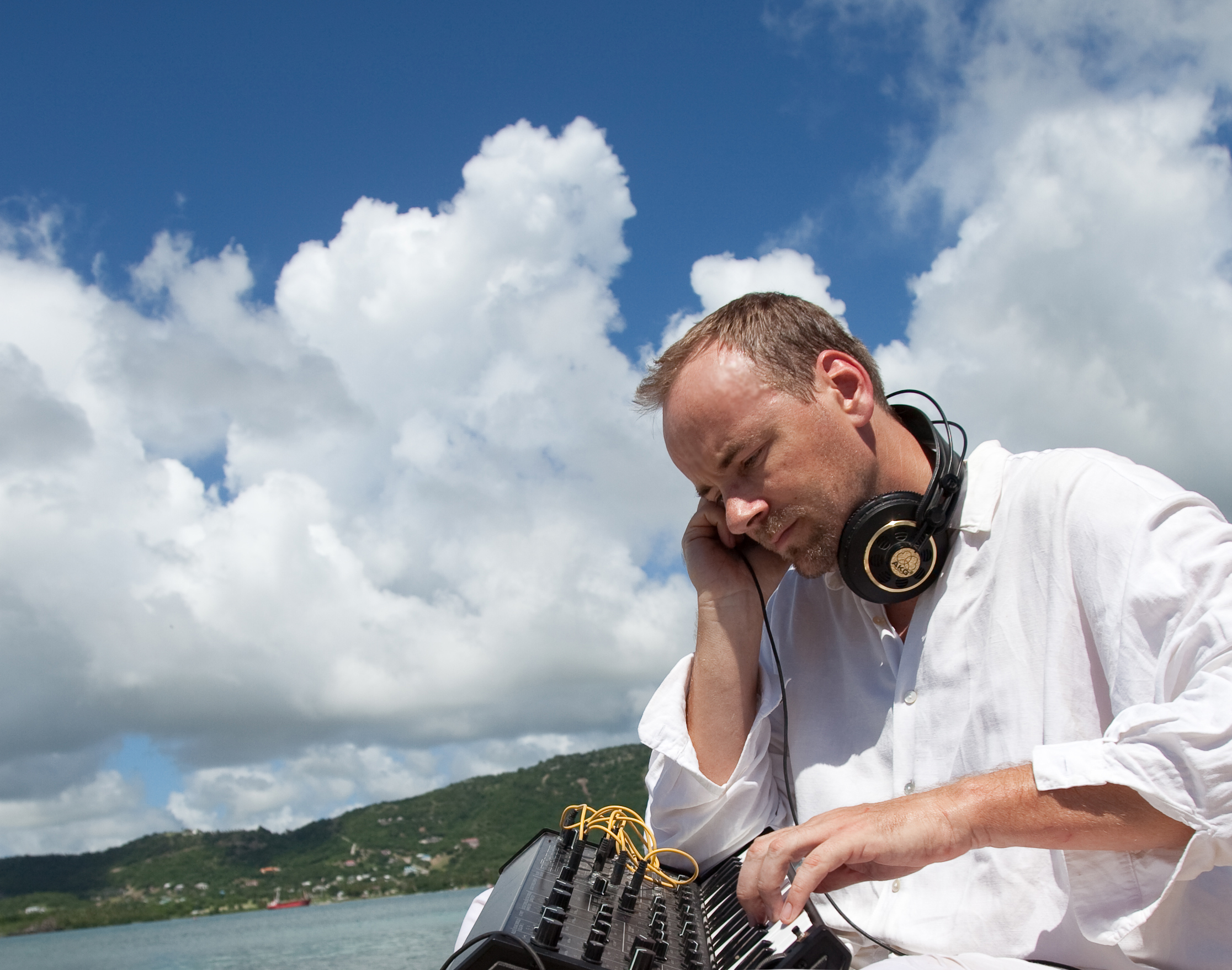
Stenzel in 2010

Late 2011 major Dutch EDM label Armada Music announced that they had joined forces with Torsten's Planet Love Records. From 1992–1998 Planet Love Records was the homebase of several of Torsten's most successful early EDM productions. Furthermore, influential and classic tracks by signed artist such as 'Dj Tatana', 'Taucher', 'Talla 2XLC' and 'Dj Sakin & Friends'. In 1998 Torsten put his work with 'Planet Love Records' on hiatus as the family moved to Ibiza for new adventures. Today the Planet Love Records production facility is situated on the Caribbean island, Antigua. Future plans for Planet Love Records and Armada Music are the release of the next artist album by York and the start of a new chillout compilation series. Furthermore, digital re-releasing several classic 'Planet Love Records' productions and new individual releases by signed artists.

Start 2012, Torsten Stenzel and Armada Music released volume 1 of a new compilation of chillout, downtempo, lounge productions. The 'Planet Chill – Compiled by York' compilations will see vol. 1–5 released within 2012. Featuring productions by Torsten's long term producer colleagues, some of his own classic productions and brand new exclusive unreleased material. Vol. 1–3 offer productions by acts such as Torsten's much respected own project 'York' and among others, international star EDM producers 'Matt Darey', 'The Thrillseekers', 'Solarstone', 'Roger Shah', 'Ayla', 'Kai Tracid', 'tyDi' & 'Mike Foyle'.

Start 2014, 'Planet Love Records' and sister-label 'Planet Love Classics' are now affiliated with Dutch record label Black Hole Recordings. An official announcement was made public on 20 January. The Black Hole management announced upcoming new releases via Planet Love Records by acts such as York, Kai Tracid, Steve Brian, Asheni, Jennifer Paige, Deep Voices and Doris Pearson. Furthermore, there will also be new 2016 remixes from tracks out of the Planet Love Classics catalogue and from his new Studio Album "Traveller".

=== Mike Oldfield – Tubular Beats ===
On 1 February 2013 world-renowned artist Mike Oldfield released the album Tubular Beats. As a collaboration between Mike Oldfield and Torsten Stenzel 'Tubular Beats' is a collection of some of the best known Oldfield tracks, remixed by Torsten under his York moniker. Unlike with previous club mixes, the album is a true two-sided collaboration between Oldfield and Stenzel, making use of parts from the original multitrack tapes as well as new parts played by Oldfield.

=== Outlanders – Outlanders ===
June 23, 2023, after 13 years of work, Tarja Turunen & Torsten released their debut album 'Outlanders' under their joint alias 'Outlanders'. The project was born in 2010 with the song 'Outlanders', inspired by lyrics of Paulo Coelho. Since then Tarja and Torsten continued writing songs and contacting talented guitar players to fulfil their ideas. The album was written mainly in the island of Antigua where the first seed was planted. The artwork photos, visualizers for the music, recordings and mixing, mostly took place there. The album went through two computer crashes, two fried motherboards and about three dead hard drives. Many of the initial versions of the songs were lost and needed to be re-programmed and re-recorded, even more than once in some cases.

== Discography ==
=== Studio albums ===
- 1996 – Taucher – Return to Atlantis
- 2001 – York – Experience
- 2001 – Taucher – Ebbe & Flut / (UK) High Tide – Low Tide
- 2001 – Two Man Ahead – The Sign of a Difference
- 2005 – Two Man Ahead – Crossing All Stars
- 2005 – York – Peace
- 2006 – All Saints – Studio 1
- 2008 – Tarja Turunen – My Winter Storm
- 2008 – Jennifer Paige – Best Kept Secret
- 2008 – Asheni – Butterfly Survival Kit
- 2012 – York – Islanders
- 2013 – Mike Oldfield – Tubular Beats (produced by York)
- 2016 – York – Traveller
- 2022 – York – Indigo
- 2023 – Outlanders – Outlanders (collaborative album with Tarja Turunen)
- 2025 - York - Infinite

=== Singles ===
- 1990 Recall IV – Contrast
- 1991 Trust In 6 – Life in Ecstasy
- 1992 Lyrical Terrorist – Lyrical Terrorists
- 1992 N.U.K.E. - Nana
- 1993 Taucher – Atlantis
- 1994 Paragliders – Paraglide
- 1995 Taucher – Fantasy
- 1995 Paragliders – Oasis
- 1995 Suspicious – Lovewaves
- 1996 Suspicious – Maid of Orleans
- 1996 Taucher – Waters
- 1996 Miss Yetti – La Pression Innovative
- 1996 DJ Buzz – Situations
- 1998 Front 242 – Headhunter
- 1998 Tatana & DJ Energy – End of Time
- 1998 YORK – The Awakening
- 1998 DJ Sakin & Friends – Protect Your Mind (For the Love of a Princess)
- 1998 Ayla – Ayla Part 2
- 1999 DJ Sakin & Friends – Nomansland
- 1999 Taucher – Bizarre / Child of a Universe (Sanvean)
- 1999 YORK – Reachers of Civilisation
- 1999 Taucher & Talla 2XLC – Nightshift
- 2000 Vanessa Mae & Sakin & Friends – Reminiscing
- 2002 ATB feat. YORK – The Fields of Love
- 2005 Elize – Automatic
- 2006 All Saints – Chickfit
- 2007 Mandala Bros. - Sleepwalking
- 2007 High 5 – Mena Fili
- 2007 DJ Sakin & Friends feat. Nadja Benaissa – Dirty Dancing
- 2008 Tarja Turunen – The Reign
- 2009 Niki Saletta & Mandala Bros. - Amazing
- 2010 DreamMan feat. YORK – Moonrise On The Beach
- 2010 Shontelle – Licky (Carnival of Souls Remix)
- 2015 The Kings Son – I'm not Rich (featuring Shaggy)
- 2017 YORK & Nathan Red feat. Doris Pearson – Moving in the Shadows
- 2017 YORK with Chola & Alexander KG Klaus – Greyhound (Remixes)
- 2017 YORK & Ramon Zenker – China Girl
- 2018 YORK – The Awakening 2018
- 2018 Made On Jupiter & YORK – Don't Care For Me
- 2019 YORK & Nathan Red feat. Kim Sanders – How Did I Fall In Love ?
- 2020 Jack Rainey & YORK – Fiction Ain't A Friend
- 2020 Jack Rainey & YORK – Fiction Ain't A Friend (Steve Brain Remix)
- 2021 YORK feat. Oly – Everything Changes
- 2021 YORK & Adam Novy – Hometown
- 2021 Nicholas Gunn & YORK feat. Sam Martin – Higher
- 2021 YORK & Au/Ra – Golden Hour
- 2021 YORK & Pull N Way – Spellbound
- 2022 YORK & SHEARS & Scot & Millfield – When You're Around
- 2022 YORK – Cry My Name
- 2002 YORK & Ava Silver – Evolving
- 2022 YORK & Steve Brian – Morning Light
- 2022 Dennis Sheperd & YORK & Iris - The Fall
- 2022 Steve Brian & YORK & Nikol Apatini – Free Love
- 2023 SOLR & YORK & Sarah de Warren – The Shore
- 2023 ATB & Au/RA & YORK – Highs & Lows
- 2023 Eran Hersh & YORK feat. Arlen Seaton – Daylight
- 2023 YORK feat. Diandra Faye - True North
- 2023 The Kiss & YORK – Synthpop Beat
- 2023 YORK & Scot & Millfield – Human
- 2023 YORK feat. Chris Howard – Bigger Than Us
- 2023 YORK & Alex M.O.R.P.H. feat. Asheni – Reach Out For Me
- 2023 Talla 2XLC & Torsten Stenzel - The Wave (Is Coming) (Rework of 1998 Taucher Remix: Sosa - The Wave (DJ Taucher Remix)
- 2024 YORK feat. Ava Silver – Above The Clouds
- 2024 Taucher & Torsten Stenzel & YORK - Atlantis (Rework of 1993 released Taucher single)
- 2024 YORK - Back To You (Endless Summer Mixes)
- 2024 Eran Hersh & SOLR & YORK - Wema
- 2024 Purple Shulz & Au/Ra & YORK - Sehnsucht (Rework of 1983 released Purple Schulz hit)
- 2024 DJ Sakin & Friends & Van der Karsten & Torsten Stenzel - Wonderland (Rework of year 2000 released trance single 'Wonderland' by Malatya 44)
- 2024 Torsten Stenzel - Interstellar (Cornfield Chase) (Trance rework of famed Hans Zimmer composition 'Cornfield Chase', taken from 2014 Hollowood Movie 'Interstellar')
- 2024 Tatana & Patrik Humann & Torsten Stenzel - End Of Time (Rework of year 1999 released trance classic 'End Of Time' by DJ Tatana & DJ Energy)
- 2024 Torsten Stenzel - Friday Night (Trance music rework of year 2021 released 'Friday Night' by Orbit)
- 2024 YORK feat. Chris Howard - Deus Ex Machina
- 2024 YORK Presents Scot & Millfield feat. Chris Howard - Kingsize Bed
- 2024 YORK - Mawaz-O
- 2024 YORK feat. Ava Silver - On Your Mind
- 2024 Talla 2XLC & Torsten Stenzel & Red Light District - Did You Hear Me? (Rework of year 1998 trance classic 'Did You Hear Me?' by Red Light District)
- 2024 YORK feat. Chris Howard - We All Return To Dust
- 2024 Mauro Picotto & YORK - Born To Die
- 2024 YORK feat. Eke - Oxytocin
- 2024 YORK x Steve Brian feat. Chris Howard - Foundation
- 2024 YORK - Falling (Piece Of Me)
- 2025 Torsten Stenzel & YORK feat. Nazzareene - Fade
- 2025 Torsten Stenzel & Mahe' - Never Give Up (YORK Mix)
- 2025 YORK - Back 2 Life
- 2025 YORK & Lordo - The Red Planet
- 2025 Talla 2XLC & YORK - 8:15 To Nowhere (Rework of year 1998 trance classic '8:15 To Nowhere' by Talla 2XLC project T2)
- 2025 YORK & Mario Hammer And The Lonely Robot - Breathing
- 2025 YORK - Monsoon
- 2025 YORK & FAWZY - Touched By God
- 2025 YORK & Adam Novy feat. Nourey - If I Were A Snowflake
- 2025 Torsten Stenzel - The Milky Way (YORK's Back To The Past Edit) (Rework of year 1994 trance classic 'The Milky Way' by Aurora Borealis)
- 2025 Fortella & YORK - On The Beach
- 2025 Talla 2XLC & YORK - Time (Rework of Hans Zimmer composition 'Time' from movie 'Inception')
- 2025 Midway & YORK - Monkey Forest
- 2025 Ayla & YORK & Nelly TGM - Left On Our Own
- 2025 Woody van Eyden x YORK & Steve Brian - My Place Called Home
- 2025 Richard Durand x YORK & Lea Key - Sunrise
- 2025 Talla 2XLC x YORK & Angel City - Euphoria
- 2025 DJ Sakin & Friends x YORK & Emma LX - Sacrifice (Torsten Stenzel Edit)
- 2025 YORK x FAWZY & Winterborn - Tales of The Truth
- 2025 YORK x Scot & Millfield x Thomas Foster & aqueliki - Fading Away
- 2025 YORK & John Grand & Lea Key - Indestructible
- 2025 JES & YORK - Starlight December
- 2025 YORK - Open Your Eyes
- 2026 Talla 2XLC x YORK & DJ Sakin & Friends - Whispers in The Wind

=== Remixes ===
- 1997 Plastic - Addicted (Taucher Remix)
- 1998 Faithless – God is A DJ (Taucher Remix)
- 1998 Mother's Pride – Floribunda (Suspicious Remix)
- 2000 Moby – Porcelain (Torsten Stenzel Remixes)
- 2000 Taucher – Bizzare (DJ Sakin vs. Stenzel Mix)
- 2003 The Sunseekers – Oasis 2003 (DJ Mind-X vs. Stenzel Mix)

=== DJ mixes/compilations ===
- 2007 Eye Trance Vol. 11
- 2000–2002 km 5 Ibiza – Vol. 3 & 4
- 2002 Chillin' in Ibiza Vol. 1
- 2003 Chillin' In Ibiza Vol. 2
- 2006 La Maison De L'Elephant Ibiza
- 2012 Planet Chill, Vol 1 – Compiled by York
- 2012 Planet Chill, Vol 2 – Compiled by York
- 2012 Planet Chill, Vol 3 – Compiled by York
- 2012 Planet Chill, Vol 4 – Compiled by York
- 2012 Planet Chill, Vol 5 – Compiled by York
- 2012 Planet Chill in The Mix (Deep Journey 2012) – Compiled by York
- 2013 Planet Chill 2013-01 – Compiled by York
- 2013 Planet Chill 2013-02 – Compiled by York
- 2013 Planet Chill 2013-03 – Compiled by York
- 2013 Planet Chill 2013-04 – Compiled by York
- 2014 Planet Chill 2014-01 – Compiled by York
- 2015 Planet Chill 2015-01 – Compiled by York
- 2015 Best of Planet Chill – Compiled by York
- 2017 Planet Chill 2017 – Compiled by York
- 2021 York & Sin Plomo Present: La Maison De L'Elephant
- 2024 In Search of Sunrise Vol.20 (York Mix) - Compiled & Mixed by York
- 2026 Technoclub Vol.78 - Mixed by Talla 2XLC, York

== Filmography ==
- 2007 Fire, Making Of, Produced by Shab Kirchner, interview Gary Dourdan
- 2008 Fire, Motion Picture, Arenico Production, produced by Rolant Hergert, ft. Gary Dourdan, Cosma Shiva Hagen, Ken Douken
- 2010 Memoirs of the Blue Soundtrack, Halivantigua Films, Produced by Bert Kirchner & Luke Hanson
- 2015 Vanishing Sail, Documentary by Indian Creek Film, Produced by Alexis Andrews & Charles Hambleton
