= Jani Kervinen =

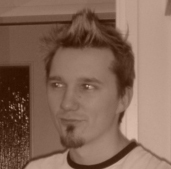
- Jani Kervinen

Background information
- Also known as: Mystery Islands, Kaste, K-De, Dyyni, Chapter G8, Soundproofed
- Born: Jani Kervinen; 1983 (age 41–42)
- Origin: Finland
- Genres: trance
- Years active: 2003 - Present
- Website: Mystery-Islands.com

Jani Kervinen is a Finnish electronic music producer, specialized mainly in the trance subgenre. He has released music under such aliases as Mystery Islands, Kaste (with Mika Savela), Dyyni (with Mika Savela), K-De (with Kai Harmaala), Chapter G8 (with Stefan Cambridge), and Soundproofed (with Simon Brisk).

== Career ==
Like other EDM producers, Jani Kervinen began using tracker-type software. After several years of experimenting with these, Kervinen received his first piece of hardware, the Roland MC-303.

=== As an amateur ===
Jani Kervinen used the Finnish site Mikseri.net, releasing music under aliases, such as coolwave and Liquid Dreamer. He created several co-productions with fellow Finn Sami Saari (not to be confused with the Finnish singer-guitarist of the same name). These co-productions, released under the guise EmissioN, was played in Italian DJ-producer Giorgio Ponticelli's former radio show Subtraxx Experience, and also received play from Misja Helsloot. The duo of Kervinen and Saari had three productions ("No Way Out", "The Coaster" and "Fallout") for free download on Mikseri.net. This came to an abrupt halt in late 2003, when Kervinen had to leave for the obligatory service in the Finnish Army, at which point EmissioN ended.

=== Professional productions ===
While co-producing with Sami Saari for the EmissioN guise, Kervinen was also working on his solo productions. Prior to his army service, Jani managed to get one track released, under the alias Mystery Islands. This track, a remix of Greg Murray & Arizona's "Daylight", was released on Afterglow Records.

After the obligatory service, Kervinen's career in trance began in early 2005. Besides his work under the Mystery Islands guise, released mainly under Monster Tunes (for which he is considered a resident artist) and Afterglow Records, Kervinen teamed up with Mika Savela to produce Kaste - "Desert Eagle", which made it to Finnish single charts, peaking at #13, and Dyyni - City Of The Moving Waters, which has also been remixed by Israeli DJ and producer Robert Gitelman.

== Discography ==
=== Original ===
- 2005: Mystery Islands - "Solace" (Monster Force)
- 2005: Dyyni - "City of Moving Waters" (Monster Pure)
- 2005: Kaste - "Desert Eagle (Anjunabeats)"
- 2006: Mystery Islands - "Mystery Islands EP" (Monster Force)
- 2006: K-De - "4th Floor (Find Me)" (Monster Sampler Series)
- 2006: Mystery Islands & Stefan Cambridge present Chapter G8 - "State Of Mind" (Monster Sampler Series)

=== Remixes ===
- 2003: Greg Murray & Arizona - "Daylight" (Mystery Islands Remix) (Afterglow Records)
- 2004: Airwave - "Save Me (Dyyni Remix)" (Monster Classics)
- 2005: Duderstadt - "Mahananda (Mystery Islands Remix)" (Afterglow Records)
- 2005: Faraway Project - "Radiate (Mystery Islands Remix)" (Afterglow Records)
- 2005: Grenz & Filmore - "Waterworld (Mystery Islands Remix)" (Monster Pure)
- 2006: Brisky - "Now And Forever (Mystery Islands Remix)" (Monster Tunes)
- 2006: Mane & Underwater pres Dot PL - "Arctic Circle (Mystery Islands Remix)" (Spectrum Sounds)
- 2007: Lowell Hales ft. Heidi Hazelton - "Move Me (Kaste Remix)" (Monster Pure)
