= I Don't Wanna Stop (song) =

Single by ATB

from the album Addicted to Music
- Released: April 7, 2003 : Germany; June 17, 2003 : US
- Genre: Electronic
- Length: 3:35
- Label: Kontor Records (Germany); Edel Records (Germany); Radikal Records (U.S.)
- Songwriters: André Tanneberger; Ken Harrison
- Producer: André Tanneberger

ATB singles chronology
| "You're Not Alone" (2002) | "I Don't Wanna Stop" (2003) | "Long Way Home" (2003) |

"I Don't Wanna Stop" was released as the first single from the ATB's album Addicted to Music. It is also found on Seven Years: 1998-2005.

== CD single track listings ==
=== I Don't Wanna Stop (Germany Release) ===
1. "I Don't Wanna Stop" (Radio Edit) 3:35
2. "I Don't Wanna Stop" (Clubb Mix) 9:27
3. "I Don't Wanna Stop" (Original Mix) 8:56

=== I Don't Wanna Stop (US Release) ===
1. "I Don't Wanna Stop" (Original Radio Mix) 3:35
2. "I Don't Wanna Stop" (Molella Radio Edit) 3:36
3. "I Don't Wanna Stop" (Original Mix) 8:57
4. "I Don't Wanna Stop" (Clubb Mix) 9:28
5. "I Don't Wanna Stop" (Molella Club Mix) 5:57
6. "Addicted To Music DVD Trailer" (Enhanced Video)

=== I Don't Wanna Stop (Netherlands Release) ===
1. "I Don't Wanna Stop" (Original Radio Mix) 3:35
2. "I Don't Wanna Stop" (Molella Radio Edit) 3:36
3. "I Don't Wanna Stop" (Clubb Mix) 9:28
4. "I Don't Wanna Stop" (Molella Club Mix) 5:57
5. "I Don't Wanna Stop" (Original Mix) 8:57

== Charts ==
| Chart (2003) | Peak position |
|---|---|
| Hungary (Single Top 40) | 4 |
