= Marakesh (band) =

Ukrainian rock band

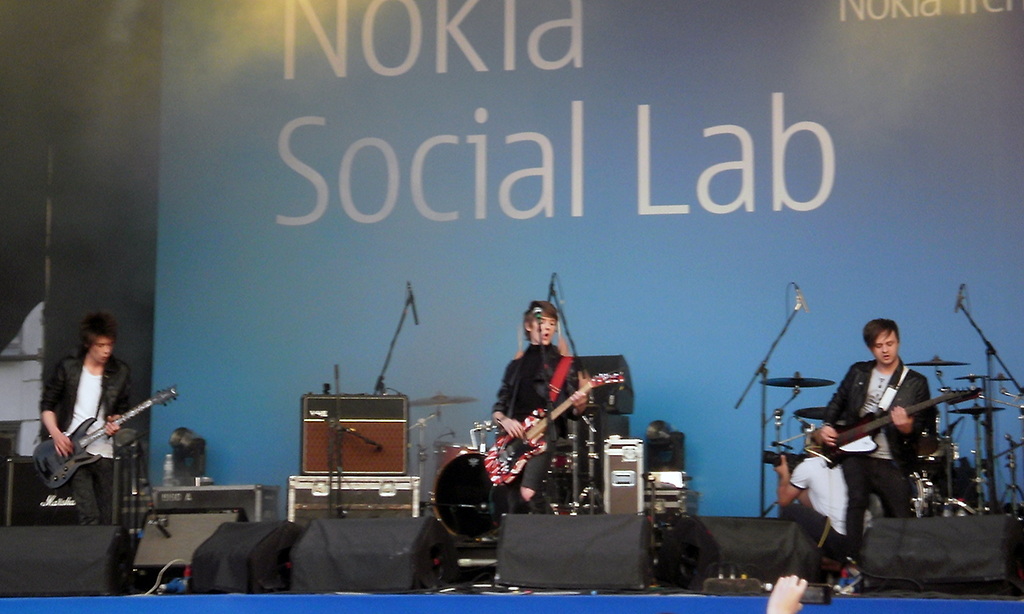
- Marakesh live in 2011

Background information
- Origin: Kyiv, Ukraine
- Genres: Alternative rock; indie rock; emo; electronic rock
- Years active: 2006–present
- Members: Mark Gritsenko; Christoph Hadl Hassel; Rich Millin; Daria Chepel
- Website: www.marakeshmusic.com

Marakesh (Ukrainian: Маракеш) are a Ukrainian rock band from Kyiv, formed in 2006. Their music is influenced by 90s alternative rock, combining rock with electronica and charismatic vocals. Their single "Jdat" (Russian: ждать) appeared in the soundtrack of Grand Theft Auto IV, resulting in hundreds of thousands official views of its music video on YouTube. The band is currently based in Berlin.

== History ==
Marakesh’s debut album Androgyny was released in 2006. It represented fully electronic sound due to being recorded by lead singer Mark Gritsenko alone, before the band’s line up was formed.

In 2007, after releasing several successful music videos, Marakesh went on an extensive tour from March to December that year. They performed mainly in Russia, where they were supported by alternative TV channels and press such as Billboard, while only relying on a word of mouth in their homeland. However numbers of shows in Ukraine grew in the next years.

Their second full-length album M was released in December 2008 after being postponed for more than a year because of a dispute with their then-label.

In 2009, Marakesh extended to open air festivals and came to Europe for the first time. In the summer they appeared at Ukrainian selection for MTV EMA, Russian festival Okna Otkroy and Hungarian ICWiP.

The band went on their first European tour for 1 month in April–May 2010, playing in Baltics, Poland, Germany and Hungary. Later that year the band was chosen by Placebo as an opening act for their show in Kyiv. In December 2010 Marakesh released their first fully English-speaking EP “Taste Me”, recorded in Budapest. Taste Me Tour saw a number of shows in Ukraine, Russia, Hungary and Germany.

In 2011, the band started composing their third LP, which was planned to be released later in 2012.

In spring 2012, the band moved to Berlin. In September 2012, Marakesh announced they have started a new band Four Phonica, which comprises all Marakesh members and the lead singer of side project Sexinspace, Daria. In January 2013, Four Phonica released the first single Divine, available for download on the band's official website. Single was followed up by a music video in March 2013. In February 2014, Four Phonica released their second music video Sabotage. Their debut self-titled EP was released on February 28, 2014.

In summer 2014, Four Phonica revealed that they are composing their debut LP and that the news about the album and single releases are awaited this year.

In August 2014, Four Phonica were chosen from over 350 applicants as one of 9 bands to participate in Berliner Pilsner Music Award.

In September 2014, Marakesh's first EP Den Svyatogo Valentina (2007) and a second full length M (2008), which were previously released only in Ukraine and Russia, became available worldwide on iTunes and Bandcamp, including one of their most well known songs Jdat from the Grand Theft Auto IV video-game soundtrack.

In November 2014, Four Phonica launched a musical crowdsourcing campaign #Songblitz. In one month time, the band created and released a cover of The Smiths' There Is a Light That Never Goes Out entirely made of musical, vocal and video contributions from fans.

In autumn of 2015, Marakesh have returned with new single Run. Run was followed up by another single Cold Call released on 12 February 2016. On November 1, 2016, Marakesh premiered an official music video for "Cold Call" on their YouTube channel. Directed by Alex Barsuk and art directed by Daria Chepel, it was shot at Turmwerk Studios, former headquarters of IAMX and a working space for such artists as Noblesse Oblige and producer Jim Abbiss among others.

In December 2016, Marakesh announced they will release 3 new singles throughout winter starting with Hand Grenade on 8 December 2016. It was followed by Mr. Correspondent in January 2017, along with a new EP 199X available only on band's Patreon page for one month before an official release. The 6-track EP was released on all other platforms on 22 February 2017 in Standard and Deluxe versions.

In March 2017, Marakesh premiered a lyric video for their first single in Russian in seven years, "Ne Lyubi" (English: Don't Love).

== Band members ==
Current members

- Mark Gritsenko – vocals, guitars, keyboards
- Alexander Petrovsky – bass, keyboards
- Valery Derevyansky – drums
- Christoph Hadl Hassel – bass, mixing, production

Live members

- Herman Gritsenko - keyboards
- Rich Millin – drums
- Daria Chepel – art direction

Former members

- Valery Popovich – guitars
- Dmitry Kvyatkovsky – guitars
- Igor Kievets – bass

== Discography ==
As Marakesh

- Androgyny (LP) (2006)
- Den Svyatogo Valentina (English: Saint Valentine's Day) (EP) (2007)
- M (LP) (2008)
- Taste Me (EP) (2010)
- My Favorite Song (single) (2011)
- 199X (EP) (2017)
- Ne Lyubi (English: Don't Love) (single) (2017)

As Four Phonica

- Divine (single) (2013)
- Sabotage (single) (2014)
- Four Phonica (EP) (2014)
- There Is a Light That Never Goes Out (single) (2014)
