= The Summer (ATB song) =

Single by ATB

from the album Two Worlds
- Released: 5 June 2000 (Germany)
- Genre: Electronic
- Length: 3:49
- Label: Kontor (Germany)
- Songwriter: André Tanneberger
- Producer: André Tanneberger

ATB singles chronology
"Killer" (1999)	"The Summer" (2000)	"The Fields of Love" (2000)

"The Summer" is a single released by ATB from his album Two Worlds.

== CD single track listings ==
=== The Summer (Germany release 1) ===
1. "The Summer" (Airplay Mix) – 3:49
2. "The Summer" (Clubb Mix) – 7:09
3. "The Summer" (Instrumental Clubb Version) – 6:30
4. "The Summer" (Ibiza Influence Version) – 5:31

=== The Summer (Germany release 2) ===
1. "The Summer" (Airplay Mix) – 3:47
2. "The Summer" (Clubb Mix) – 7:04

=== The Summer (Australia release) ===
1. "The Summer" (Airplay Mix) – 3:49
2. "The Summer" (Clubb Mix) – 7:09
3. "The Summer" (Instrumental Clubb Version) – 6:30
4. "The Summer" (Ibiza Influence Version) – 5:31
5. "The Summer" (Enhanced Video)

=== The Summer (Portugal release) ===
1. "The Summer" (Airplay Edit) – 3:49
2. "The Summer" (Clubb Mix) – 7:09
3. "The Summer" (Instrumental Clubb Version) – 6:30

== Charts ==
Chart performance for "The Summer"
Chart (2000)	Peak position
Australia (ARIA)	61
Europe (European Hot 100 Singles)	82
Finland (Suomen virallinen lista)	20
Germany (GfK)	21
Netherlands (Single Top 100)	72
Portugal (AFP)	10
Romania (Romanian Top 100)	1
Sweden (Sverigetopplistan)	47
Switzerland (Schweizer Hitparade)	46

Annual chart rankings for "The Summer"
Chart (2000)	Rank
European Airplay (Border Breakers)	76
