= Let U Go (ATB song) =

2001 single by ATB

Single by ATB

from the album Dedicated
- Released: May 14, 2001
- Genre: Dance
- Length: 3:30
- Label: Kontor
- Songwriters: André Tanneberger, Ken Harrison, Robert Michaels
- Producer: André Tanneberger

ATB singles chronology
| "The Fields of Love" (2000) | "Let U Go" (2001) | "Hold You" (2001) |

"Let U Go" is a song originally written by the Canadian musicians Ken Harrison and Robert Michaels as "Wrong to Let You Go". This pop-rock song, recorded by the Wild Strawberries, the band consisting of Harrison and his wife Roberta Carter, first appeared on volume 3 of the compilation album series Women & Songs, then on the Wild Strawberries album Twist (2000). German dance DJ and producer ATB remixed the song and released it twice as a single, it being ATB's 6th and 15th single releases.

The first version of the song was released on CD 1 (The World of Movement) of ATB's second album Two Worlds, which was released in 2000. The song bore a similar sound to prior singles "The Fields of Love" and "The Summer" from the same album.

A year later ATB remixed the song again for a single release. By doing this he stepped away from his traditional sound and created a harder dance track, leaving out pitch-bends and guitar sounds. Apart from these changes, a second verse was also added to the song and a new main-hook was created. The single became ATB's biggest hit in his home country Germany, as it was his first, and only, top ten single, reaching number seven. It was the last ATB single to be released in the UK, the song peaked at number 34 in the United Kingdom. Eventually this version of the song appeared on his third album Dedicated, which also contained additional songs produced from the now-ongoing collaboration between Tanneberger and the Wild Strawberries.

== Track listings ==
=== Let U Go (Germany release 1) ===
1. "Let U Go" (Airplay Mix) 3:30
2. "Let U Go" (ATB Remix) 7:03
3. "Let U Go" (UK Dub Mix) 6:46
4. "Let U Go" (Clubb Mix) 8:12
5. "Let U Go" (Trisco Remix) 6:46
6. "Let U Go" (Wippenberg Remix) 6:38

=== Let U Go (Germany release 2) ===
1. "Let U Go" (Airplay Mix) 3:30
2. "Let U Go" (ATB Remix) 7:03
3. "Let U Go" (UK Dub Mix)
4. "Let U Go" (Club Mix) 8:12
5. "Let U Go" (Wippenberg Remix) 6:39

=== Let U Go (Germany release 3) ===
1. "Let U Go" (Airplay Mix) 3:30
2. "Let U Go" (Trisco Remix) 9:00
3. "Let U Go" (UK Dub Mix) 6:46

=== Let U Go (US release) ===
1. "Let U Go" (Airplay Mix) 3:30
2. "Let U Go" (Clubb Mix) 8:12
3. "Let U Go" (ATB Remix) 7:03
4. "Let U Go" (Wippenberg Remix) 6:38
5. "Let U Go" (UK Dub Mix) 6:46
6. "The Summer" 3:39

=== Let U Go (Australia release) ===
1. "Let U Go" (Airplay Mix) 3:29
2. "Let U Go" (Clubb Mix) 8:19
3. "Let U Go" (ATB Remix) 7:04
4. "Let U Go" (UK Dub Mix) 6:49

=== Let U Go (Netherlands release) ===
1. "Let U Go" (Airplay Mix) 3:32
2. "Let U Go" (Clubb Mix) 8:18

== Chart performance ==
=== Weekly charts ===
| Chart (2001) | Peak position |
|---|---|
| Austria (Ö3 Austria Top 40) | 15 |
| Finland (Suomen virallinen lista) | 19 |
| Germany (GfK) | 7 |
| Hungary (Mahasz) | 3 |
| Poland (Polish Airplay Charts) | 27 |
| Scottish Singles Sales (Official Charts) | 21 |
| Switzerland (Schweizer Hitparade) | 84 |
| UK Singles (Official Charts) | 34 |

=== Year-end charts ===
| Chart (2001) | Position |
|---|---|
| Germany (Media Control) | 51 |

== Let U Go Reworked ==
"Let U Go (Reworked)"

Single by ATB

from the album Seven Years: 1998-2005
- Released: December 16, 2005
- Genre: Dance
- Length: 3:26
- Label: Kontor
- Songwriters: Ken Harrison, André Tanneberger
- Producer: André Tanneberger

ATB singles chronology
| "Humanity" (2005) | "Let U Go (Reworked)" (2005) | "Summer Rain" (2006) |

"Let U Go (Reworked)" is a single released by German dance musician ATB. The original "Wrong to Let You Go" had been written by Ken Harrison of the pop-rock band Wild Strawberries and world Guitarist Robert Michaels . ATB remixed it several times to release a dance version of the song in 2001.

In 2005 a greatest hits album called Seven Years was released, which included all previous singles and several new songs. One of these was "Let U Go (2005 Reworked)," being the former dance-single that had been turned into a calm pop-song. Roberta Harrison's vocals, which originally featured the song, were replaced by those of male singer Jan Löchel, who also played the guitar parts of this new version. An uptempo dance edit of the album version was eventually released as an MP3-single and vinyl. Unlike the album version, the radio edit contained bits that reminded of the 2001 single release. Later a CD-single was released elsewhere.

=== Track listings ===
==== Let U Go reworked (Germany release 1) ====
1. "Let U Go (Reworked)" (Airplay Mix) 3:26
2. "Let U Go (Reworked)" (Ambient Remix) 3:43
3. "Let U Go (Reworked)" (AT&R Remix) 8:16
4. "Let U Go (Reworked)" (Tocadisco Doesn't Give a Rat's Ass Mix) 7:01
5. "Let U Go (Reworked)" (E-Craig's 2005 Rework) 7:32

==== Let U Go reworked (Germany release 2) ====
1. "Let U Go (Reworked)" (Airplay Mix) 3:26
2. "Let U Go (Reworked)" (Tocadisco Doesn't Give a Rat's Ass Mix) 7:01
3. "Let U Go (Reworked)" (AT&R Remix) 8:16
4. "Let U Go (Reworked)" (E-Craig's 2005 Rework) 7:31

=== Charts ===
| Chart (2005) | Peak position |
|---|---|
| Hungary (Dance Top 40) | 25 |
