= The Fields of Love =

2001 single by ATB and York

Single by ATB featuring York

from the album Two Worlds (ATB) and Experience (York)
- Released: October 9, 2000: Germany; January 23, 2001: US
- Genre: Trance, electronic rock
- Length: 3:41
- Label: Kontor Records (Germany); Radikal Records (U.S.)
- Songwriters: André Tanneberger; Torsten Stenzel
- Producer: André Tanneberger

ATB singles chronology
"The Summer" (2000)	"The Fields of Love" (2000)	"Let U Go" (2001)

"The Fields of Love" is a single released by ATB from his second studio album Two Worlds. It features the music group York who also included it on their album Experience, albeit in the 'Dubmix'.

After reaching the UK Top 20, the song featured on The New Pepsi Chart Album 2001 at place 20.

== Track listing ==
=== The Fields of Love (Germany Release 1) ===
1. "The Fields of Love" (Airplay Mix) 3:41
2. "The Fields of Love" (Original Club Mix) 6:24
3. "The Fields of Love" (York Remix) 7:31
4. "The Fields of Love" (Instrumental) 6:24

=== The Fields of Love (Germany Release 2) ===
1. "The Fields of Love" (Airplay Mix) 3:45
2. "The Fields of Love" (Public Domain Remix) 8:00
3. "The Fields of Love" (Darude Remix) 7:26

=== The Fields of Love (US Release) ===
1. "The Fields of Love" (Airplay Mix) 3:41
2. "The Fields of Love" (Original Club Mix) 6:24
3. "The Fields of Love" (York Remix) 7:31
4. "The Fields of Love" (Darude Remix) 7:31
5. "The Fields of Love" (Instrumental Club Mix) 6:24

=== The Fields of Love (Netherlands Release) ===
1. "The Fields of Love" (Airplay Mix) 3:41
2. "The Fields of Love" (Original Club Mix) 6:24

=== The Fields of Love (Canada Release) ===
1. "The Fields of Love" (Airplay Mix) 3:41
2. "The Fields of Love" (Original Club Mix) 6:24
3. "The Fields of Love" (Remix) 7:31
4. "The Fields of Love" (Darude Remix) 7:31
5. "The Fields of Love" (Instrumental) 6:24
6. "The Summer" (Airplay Mix) 3:49
7. "The Summer" (Clubb Mix) 7:09
8. "The Summer" (Instrumental) 6:30
9. "The Summer" (Ibiza Influence) 5:31

== Charts ==
Chart (2000/2001)	Peak position
Canada (Nielsen SoundScan)	27
Europe (European Hot 100 Singles)	64
Finland (Suomen virallinen lista)	12
Germany (Media Control Charts)	42
Poland Airplay (Music & Media)	17
Switzerland (Schweizer Hitparade)	97
UK Singles (The Official Charts Company)	16

=== Year-end charts ===
Chart (2001)	Position
Canada (Nielsen SoundScan)	127
