= Wild Strawberries (band) =

Canadian pop rock band

- Origin: Canada
- Genres: Pop rock, alternative rock
- Years active: 1988–present
- Labels: Strawberry Records, Nettwerk
- Members: Roberta Carter-Harrison; Ken Harrison
- Past members: Braz King
- Website: www.wildstrawberries.com

Wild Strawberries is a Canadian pop rock band consisting of married couple Roberta Carter-Harrison (vocals) and Ken Harrison. They have released a number of albums, their latest being dear post haste (2020).

== History ==
Wild Strawberries was established during the couple's time at university, during which they would hold jam sessions with friends. In 1988, the band submitted the song "Crying Shame" to Toronto radio station CFNY for its new music search contest; it won the contest, and received airplay from the station.

Harrison established a studio, enabling the band to produce its early releases independently, and led to the founding of the Strawberry Records label. The album Grace drew the attention of record label A&M Records of Canada, which would distribute the band's next release, the album Bet You Think I'm Lonely.

The success of Bet You Think I'm Lonely resulted in a national concert tour and a contract with Nettwerk, a Vancouver-based independent record label, for the production of their albums. Two albums were released under that label; a third album, Twist, was initially sponsored by Nettwerk, but creative differences resulted in the dissolution of the partnership.

The band has since eliminated all dependence on record labels, preferring instead independent production and promotion; the band adopted a strategy to promote themselves directly to fans. With the release of Deformative Years, the band simultaneously released an extended web film utilizing music from the album. The costs of producing this video were substantially lower than a music video production for television music stations, such as MTV or MuchMusic.

The success of Bet You Think I'm Lonely also earned the band a 1995 Juno Award nomination for Best New Group. Other early hits for the duo included "Life-Sized Marilyn Monroe" and "Crying Shame".

The song "I Don't Want To Think About It" is part of the soundtrack of the 1996 film Foxfire. Other songs by the band have been included in the soundtracks for the films At Sachem Farm, The Highwayman (2000), Stir of Echoes (1999), Suspicious River (2000), and Universal Soldier II: Brothers in Arms (1998).

The song "I Don't Want To Think About It" is found on Now! 2, which was distributed in Canada circa 1997.

=== Collaborations ===
One of the band's most-heard songs, "Wrong to Let You Go", was preceded and followed by collaborations with other musicians. The concept for the track was defined by Alan Fletcher, executive producer at Warner Music Canada, after Roberta Carter-Harrison sang at his wedding alongside flamenco guitarist Robert Michaels. It was then recorded with Michaels for volume 3 of the Women & Songs compilation album series and later appeared as an unnumbered track on the Twist album.

Subsequently, Alan Fletcher from Warner put the band in contact with German electronic dance producer and DJ André Tanneberger (ATB). Tanneberger produced a remix of the song, released as an ATB single re-titled "Let U Go". This popularized the song on both continents, as the single reached number 18 on the U.S. Billboard Hot Dance Music/Club Play charts and number 7 on the German Singles Chart. The song also marked the point in ATB's musical output when he began to produce songs with full vocal tracks, as opposed to sampled and looped vocals.

The Wild Strawberries and ATB went on to collaborate on further songs, including the subsequent ATB single "Hold You" and album tracks from the 2002 ATB album Dedicated, and multiple subsequent singles ("I Don't Wanna Stop", "Long Way Home") and album tracks from the 2003 ATB album Addicted to Music. All songs were co-written by Ken and Tanneberger, with vocals by Roberta.

Tanneberger later produced a new recording of "Let U Go" for the 2005 greatest hits compilation Seven Years: 1998–2005, with new male vocalist Jan Löchel.

Sarah McLachlan played guitar on and appeared in the video for "I Don't Want to Think About It". The band participated in all three years of the Lilith Fair music festival, which McLachlan founded.

== Discography ==
- Carving Wooden Spectacles (independent release, 1989)
- Grace (1991)
- Life Sized Marilyn Monroe (EP, 1993)
- Bet You Think I'm Lonely (Strawberry Records, 1994)
- Heroine (Nettwerk, 1995)
- Quiver (Nettwerk, 1998)
- Twist (independent release, 2000)
- Deformative Years (independent release, 2005)
- Go Project (independent release, 2013)
- Vesper 50 (independent release, 2017)
- dear post haste (independent release, 2020)

== Singles ==
- "Crying Shame" (1994) [#23 CAN]
- "Bet You Think I'm Lonely" (1994) [#24 CAN]
- "I Don't Want to Think About It" (1996) [#9 CAN]
