= Marrakech (song) =

Single by ATB

from the album No Silence
- Released: May 3, 2004 : Germany; Aug 3, 2004 : US
- Genre: Electronic
- Length: 3:47
- Label: Kontor Records (Germany); Radikal Records (U.S.)
- Songwriters: André Tanneberger; Bruce Elliott-smith; Phil Larsen
- Producer: André Tanneberger

ATB singles chronology
"In Love with the DJ/Sunset Girl" (2003)	"Marrakech" (2004)	"Ecstasy" (2004)

"Marrakech" was released as the first single from ATB's album No Silence. The vocals in the song were provided by Tiff Lacey, who also lent her voice to the album's second single, "Ecstasy." Marrakech was featured in the European soundtrack for the movie Mindhunters, and it can be heard during the film's ending credits and in some of its promotional trailers.

== CD single track listings ==
=== Marrakech (Germany Release) ===
1. "Marrakech" (Airplay Mix) 3:47
2. "Marrakech" (A & T Remix) 8:37
3. "Marrakech" (Clubb Mix) 11:18
4. "Marrakech" (Revolution Mix) 9:16

=== Marrakech (US Release) ===
1. "Marrakech" (Airplay Mix) 3:45
2. "Marrakech" (A&T Remix) 8:35
3. "Marrakech" (Clubb Mix) 11:17
4. "Marrakech" (Live @ Nowhere Mix) 11:30
5. "Marrakech" (Revolution Mix) 9:16

== Charts ==
Chart (2004)	Peak position
Hungary (Dance Top 40)	11
Hungary (Single Top 40)	2
