= York (duo) =

YORK
- Born: Torsten Stenzel and Jörg Stenzel
- Origin: Bad Homburg, Germany
- Genres: Downtempo, chill-out, trance, house
- Instruments: Guitar, piano, synthesizer
- Years active: 1997–present
- Labels: Planet Love Records, Black Hole Recordings, Armada Music, Enhanced Recordings, Kontor Records
- Website: Facebook.com/YorkMusic

YORK is a German electronic music duo, founded in 1997 by musicians and brothers Torsten and Jörg Stenzel. Producing ambient, downtempo, chillout, house and trance, their productions are known for catchy guitar hooks, atmospheric soundscapes and delicate dance textures.

== Career ==
Torsten Stenzel began his musical career early in his childhood, learning the piano from the age of five when he began his classical training. In the early 1990s his musical orientation changed, and he discovered the growing techno/house movement. He built his own recording studio. Torsten Stenzel is credited for several gold and platinum awards, an 'Echo' nomination and over three million record sales.

Jörg Stenzel has, since the age of eleven, been interested in stringed instruments, the guitar in particular. The two brothers combined their talents in 1997 and project YORK was born.

YORK has released four successful UK singles. Their first single, "The Awakening", reached #11 in the UK Singles Chart in October 1999. Their second single, "On the Beach" (which sampled Chris Rea's song, "On the Beach") was their biggest hit, the 'CRW edit' helped the single to reach #4 in the UK chart in June 2000, and it sold over 200,000 copies. The next chart entry "Farewell To The Moon" reached #37 in November 2000. Their final UK hit single to date was "The Fields of Love" which featured ATB. It reached #16 in January 2001.

YORK joined the label Offshore Music (based in Switzerland) in 2004, with their club hit singles "Iceflowers" (playlisted by Judge Jules) and "Mercury Rising". The same year their album Peace was released by EMI Music Switzerland. In November 2010, YORK left the Offshore Record Label.

As of late 2011, YORK was signed to the major Dutch dance record label Armada Music. A new album, Islanders was released 28 September 2012, with three tracks released as singles: "Wanna Be Known", "Touched by God" and "Salida del Sol". The track "Islanders" is a collaboration with British multi-instrumentalist and composer Mike Oldfield.

In February 2013, a new collaboration with Mike Oldfield was released; the album Tubular Beats is an album with the best of Mike Oldfield's tracks, remixed by YORK.

The new album titled Traveler was released on July 8, 2016.

== Discography ==
=== Albums ===
- Experience (2001)
- Peace (2004)
- Islanders (2012)
- Tubular Beats (2013)
- Traveller (2016)
- Indigo (2022)

=== Singles ===
- "The Awakening" (1998)
- "Jastamba" (feat. Jamila) (1998)
- "On The Beach" (1999)
- "Reachers of Civilisation" (1999)
- "The Fields of Love" (feat. ATB) (2000)
- "Farewell to the Moon" (2000)
- "Yesterday (Silence)" (feat. Alaska (2001)
- "Bella" (2001)
- "At The Sea" (2003)
- "I Need You" (2004)
- "Sunset Road" (feat. DJ Shah) (2004)
- "Iceflowers" (feat. Angelina) (2005)
- "We Are Young" (with Sin Plomo feat. Janet Taylor) (2005)
- "Mercury Rising" (feat. Asheni) (2006)
- "Moonrise on the Beach" (feat. DreamMan) (2010)
- "Wanna Be Known" (feat. Brandon Jones) (2011)
- "Red Violin" (feat. Rebels Without a Cause and Lola Grover) (2012)
- "Touched by God" (2012)
- "Salida Del Sol" (feat. Steve Brian) (2012)
- "Swan Dive" (2012)
- "Nightmare" (feat. JPL) (2013)
- "A.F.R.I.C.A." (vs. DJ Shog and Vintage & Morelli) (2013)
- "If Only I" (feat. Tarja Turunen) (2013)
- "Daydream" (feat. Thrillseekers and Asheni) (2013)
- "Across the Ocean" (vs. M.I.K.E. and Asheni) (2013)
- "On the Beach 2013" (2013)
- "Lost Under the Sun" (feat. Jennifer Paige) (2013)
- "Lost in a Circle" (feat. Hammer & Asheni) (2014)
- "Unchain Your Soul" (feat. Steve Brian) (2014)
- "With You" (meets Deep Voices feat. Alexander K.G. Klaus) (2014)
- "Maarif 71" (with Mohamed Bahi) (2014)
- "This Is What It's All About" (vs. Kai Tracid) (2014)
- "Access" (with Bilal el Aly) (2014)
- "Blue Sun" (with Nick Winth) (2015)
- "Kings & Queens" (with Ayla & Taucher) (2015)
- "Free Yourself" (with Ayla & Taucher feat. Juno Im Park) (2015)
- "Back to You" (with ATB) (2015)
- "Lilyleaf Ladybell" (with Marco Torrance) (2015)
- "We Are" (feat. Arlen) (2016)
- "Once Upon a Time" (feat. Dreamy) (2016)
- "This World Is So Amazing" (feat. Rank 1 & Lola) (2016)
- "My Life Is Yours" (feat. Theo) (2017)
- "Forget to Remember" (feat. Marco Torrance & Asheni) (2017)
- "Moving in the Shadows" (feat. Nathan Red & Doris Pearson) (2017)
- "Greyhound" (with Chola & Alexander KG Klaus) (2017)
- "China Girl" (with Ramon Zenker) (2017)
- "Yesterday (Remixes)" (2018)
- "Don't Care for Me" (with Made On Jupiter) (2018)
- "Fiction Ain't a Friend" (with Jack Rainey) (2020)
- "Everything Changes" (feat. Oly) (2021)
- "Higher" (feat. Nicholas Gunn) (2021)
- "Tonight" (feat. Dead Vegetable) (2021)
- "Spellbound" (feat. Pull 'n' Away) (2021)
- "When You're Around" (with SHEARS & Scot & Millfield) (2022)
- "Cry My Name" (2022)
- "Evolving" (with Ava Silver) (2022)
- "Morning Light" (with Steve Brian) (2022)
- "Destinations EP" (2022)
- "Free Love" (with Steve Brian & Nikol Apatini) (2022)
- "The Shore" (with SOLR & Sarah de Warren) (2023)
- "Highs & Lows" (with ATB & Au/Ra) (2023)
- "Daylight" (with Eran Hersh & Arlen Seaton) (2023) (cover version of 'Daylight', by David Kushner)
- "True North" (with Diandra Faye) (2023)

=== Compilations ===
- "La Maison De L’Elephant" (2005)
- "Planet Chill, vol. 1" (2012)
- "Planet Chill, vol. 2" (2012)
- "Planet Chill, vol. 3" (2012)
- "Planet Chill, vol. 4" (2012)
- "Planet Chill, vol. 5" (2012)
- "Planet Chill 2013-01" (2013)
- "Planet Chill 2013-02" (2013)
- "Planet Chill 2013-03" (2013)
- "Planet Chill 2013-04" (2013)
- "Planet Chill 2014-01" (2014)
- "The Best of Planet Chill, Vol. 1" (2015)
- "Planet Chill 2017" (2017)
- "La Maison De L’Elephant" (2021) (York & Sin Plomo Present)

=== Collaborations ===
- DJ Sakin - Walk on Fire (1999)
  - "Walk on Fire"
- Sunlounger - Another Day on the Terrace (2007) (Jörg Stenzel providing guitar parts)
  - "White Sand"
  - "Aguas Blancas"
  - "Hierbas Ibicencas"
  - "Lumumba"
- Sunlounger - Balearic Beauty (2013) (Jörg Stenzel providing guitar parts)
  - "Relaxation"
- ATB - Contact (2014)
  - "Right Back to You" (ATB & York feat. JES)
- ATB - Two Worlds (2000)
  - "The Fields of Love" (ATB feat. York)
- Steve Brian - Wanderlust (2018)
  - "Yamakhosi" (Steve Brian & York feat. Tumi Thusi)
- ATB & York & Au/Ra - "Highs & Lows" (2023)

=== Remixes ===
- "Electric Nature - Electric Nature (York mix)" (1998)
- "Dolphin's Mind - Believe In You (The Whistle Song)(York remix)" (1998)
- "Three Drives On A Vinyl - Greece 2000 (York remix)" (1998)
- "Progress - Everybody (York remix)" (1999)
- "DJ Piero - I Can't Stop Lovin' You (York remix)" (2000)
- "Degeneration - Una Musica Senzerismo 2000 (York remix)" (2000)
- "Michael MB - The Power Of Trancebase (York remix)" (2000)
- "Schiller - Dancing With Loneliness (York remix)" (2001)
- "Janet Taylor - Another Day (York remix)" (2001)
- "Watermen - Your Love Is Setting Me Free (York remix) (2001)
- "Darren Bailie - Protect Your Mind 2009 (York remix) (2009)
- "Work of Art - World Spinning (York planet chillmix)" (2012)
- "Tarmo Tammel - Lost Somewhere (York mix)" (2012)
- "Lifted Emotion - Vinicity (York mix)" (2012)
- "Igor Dyachkov & U-Jeen - Evolution (York's I Feel Like 132 BPM remix)" (2012)
- "Damien.S vs. Under - The Cars Below (York remix)" (2014)
- "Floe - Hysteresis (York retouch version)" (2014)
- "Funkstar Deluxe - Sun Is Shining (Steve Brian & York radio edit)" (2014)
- "J.Nation feat. Jah Cure - Kings (York´s House Remix)" (2015)
- "T.O.M. - Stardust (York vs. Maglev Remix)" (2016)
- "French - Infinity (York & Marco Torrance remix)" (2017)
- "Anthya - Tears Of The Rain (York remix)" (2017)
- "SeeB & Highasakite - Free To Go (York Remix)" (2019)
- "Adam Novy - Hometown (York vs. Adam Novy Mix)" (2021)
- "Mearzie - Hymn (York Remix)" (2023)
- "Ladybyrd - Every Second (York Remix)" (2023)
- "Thysma feat. Lauren L'aimant - Skyline (York Remix)" (2023)
