= Marco Ardemagni =

Italian radio personality and writer

Marco Ardemagni (Milan, 15 March 1963) is an Italian radio personality, writer and television presenter. He is active with RAI, especially Rai Radio 2, and, since 2022, is one of the two presenters of Rai Italia's original English-language magazine program Paparazzi.

== Biography ==
=== Radio presenter and author ===
He debuted in 1986 at Radio Popolare where he took part in Borderline, Piovigginando Pepe, Notturnover and especially Bar Sport (where he followed, live, among other events, the FIFA World Cups from 1990 to 2006), with Sergio Ferrentino and Giorgio Lauro. For RAI, he appeared from 1997 to 2000, then again from 2004 to 2011 as author, invitee and poet at Caterpillar, a program on Rai Radio 2 presented at the time by Massimo Cirri and Sergio Ferrentino, later replaced by Filippo Solibello. With Ferrentino, Lauro and Luca Gattuso, he presented Catersport on the same network from 2000 to 2012, where he was sent to cover three consecutive Olympics, Athens 2004, Turin 2006 and Beijing 2008. Still on Radio 2, he presented Caterpillar AM from September 2011 to June 2024 together with Filippo Solibello, Cinzia Poli and Claudia de Lillo, alias Elasti (who replaced Benedetta Tobagi (2011–2012) and Natascha Lusenti (2012–2014)). During the 2012 Summer Olympics in London, he commented the competitions on Radio 2 alongside Giorgio Lauro and Filippo Solibello as presenter of Caterpillar AM Olimpico. In 2015, from Rai's Milan radio studio during Expo 2015, he presented a daily program for the duration of the event and on Rai Web Radio 7. In the summer of 2016, on Radio 2, he presented Colpo di Sole (A Touch of Sun) daily in the afternoons, with Gabriella Greison and Alessandro Mannucci. In May 2017, he presents with Solibello a Radio 2 program dedicated to all of the arrivals of each stage of the 2017 Giro d'Italia. From 2017 to January 2018, he was one of the authors of KGG, airing on Radio 2 in the afternoon.

=== Television presenter and author ===
For television, he was author from 1995 to 2004 of TG Rosa, Sorvegliati Speciali (Odeon TV), Space Girls (Happy Channel) Music Zoo (Rete A-All Music) for Barter TV and in 2006 for Grundy Italia of Andata e ritorno (Rai 2). He also wrote the lyrics to Skytoon for Attenti a quei due on Sky Sport 1 in 2007-8 and 2008–9. Still for Manticx he was the author, with Maurizio Sangalli, of Vuoi Scommettere?, airing on Sky Sport 1 in 2012. In 2010, he was sent to two Rai 3 programs, Quelli di Caterpillar (June-luglio 2010) and Caternoster (September–December 2010), presented by Massimo Cirri and Filippo Solibello. With Solibello for Rai 2, he commented the final of the 2012 Eurovision Song Contest, repeating the same in 2013 (with Natascha Lusenti) and the 2014 semifinals and the 2015 contest, aired on Rai 4. For the Sanremo Music Festival 2014, he presented alongside Solibello Dopofestival, streaming on Rai's website. In the same year, he was one of the guests of Quelli che il calcio on Rai 2. For Rai 4, he commented with Solibello the opening concert of UEFA Euro 2016, the 2016 and 2017 Emmy Awards and the 2017 Brit Awards. From September 2022, he is the co-host along with longtime companion Filippo Solibello of Paparazzi!, the first daily program produced by RAI in English, aired on its international channel Rai Italia and on RaiPlay. From October to December 2022, he wrote and presented, alongside Claudia de Lillo and Filippo Solibello, Alle 8 in tre, on Rai 2. From September 2021, he is one of the authors of a small cartoon comic during Sport Mediaset XXL, on Italia1.

In 2014, with Filippo Solibello, he did the narration of the Doppio Taglio play, by Cristina Gamberi, with the supervision of Lucia Vasini, played by Marina Senesi.

=== Events ===
He took in part of numerous live events, such as Caccia al Libro (for Associazione Italiana Editori) in 1994, Extrafestival (for Radio Popolare) in 2000–2001, Sentieri Acustici (for Pistoia Province) in 2006 and 2007, the Senigallia Fireworks Festival in 2012 and, from 2013, at several events at the Overtime Festival (Macerata), Tipicità (Fermo) and Tipicità in Blu (Ancona). Since 2017, he's the official referee of Pugilato Letterario™. On 1 May 2013, he collaborated with the 24th edition of the May 1st concert, entrusted to and aired on Rai 3.

=== Writing and poetry ===
In 1989, he found, with Gianni Micheloni e Antonio Pezzinga, the experimental poetry group Bufala Cosmica, which was joined in 1990 by Alessandra Berardi. The group presented itself in live readings of surreal poetry and published, in 1992, for Sperling & Kupfer, the poetry volume Rime Tempestose. The second poetry volume, this time as sole author, was the Irrimediabilmente Rime - Poesie a pedalata assistita collection, which was released by Edizioni Eraclea in 2015.

In 2022, he is one of the seven authors of Biancaneve e i settenari - Antologia di poesia giocosa (Bompiani), curated by Stefano Bartezzaghi.

Among his non-poetic works: in 2013, for Eraclea Libreria Sportiva, Ardemagni pubçlished Ininterrottamente Inter - Entomologia di un'epopea defined as "the most detailed account of a football match ever written": the match in question was Bayern-Inter, the 2010 UEFA Champions League final. In 2018, he publishes, still with Edizioni Eraclea, Ultime notizie della Rosetta - Milano, 1913 - Morte di una ragazza: a reconstruction of the death of Elvira Andrezzi, known as "La Rosetta". Still before in 1998, with Lauro e Ferrentino, he published Pebbacco o devi morire for Comix, a magazine he collaborated with. he also wrote at other magazines Sette, Cuore e Gulliver.

=== Private life ===
After living his childhood in Milan, he moved to Vimercate (MB) with his family, where he finished his high school studies. In the 90s, he married and moved to Brianza.
