= Step and repeat =

Publicity backdrop

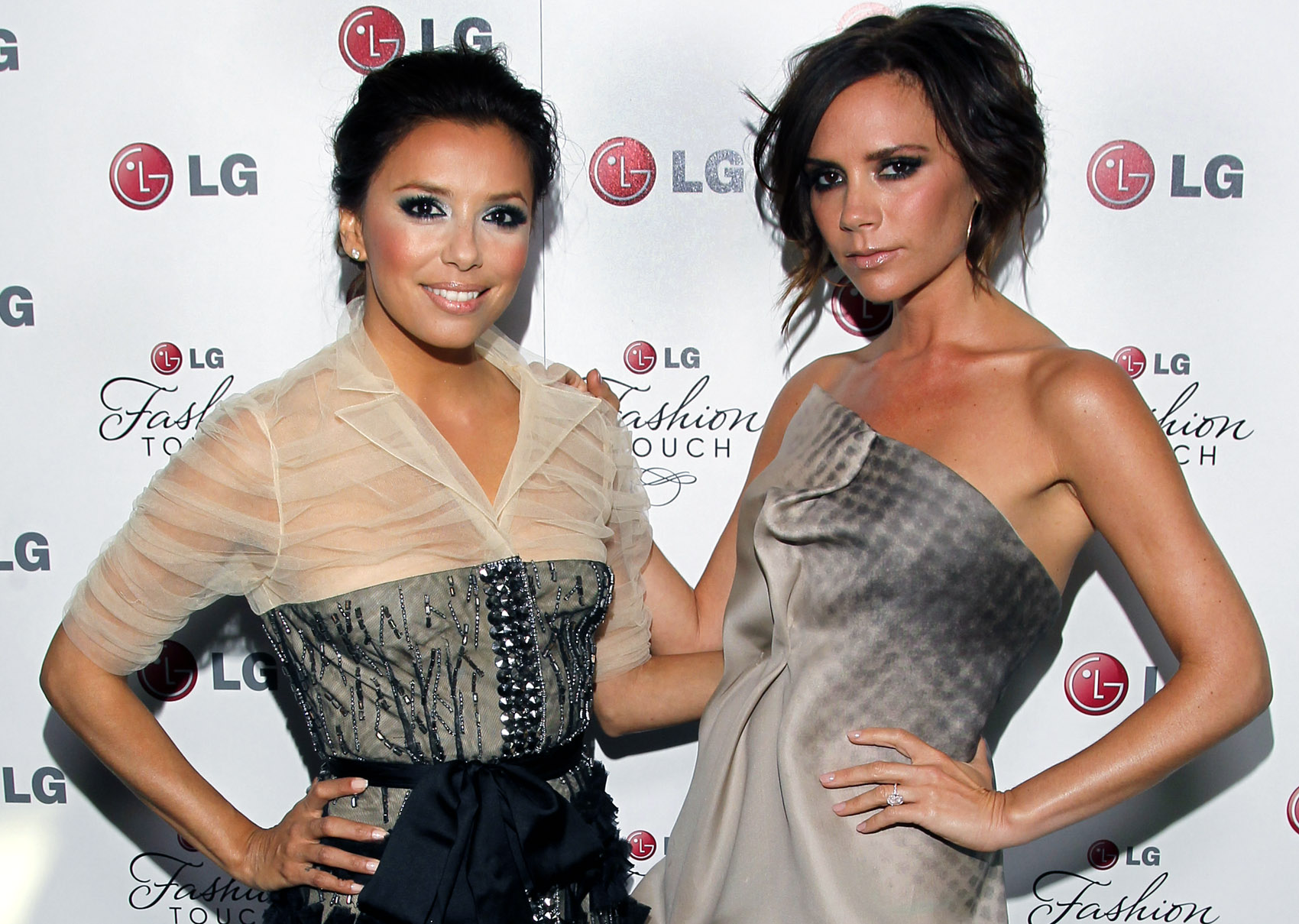
Eva Longoria and Victoria Beckham step in front of a step and repeat.

A step and repeat banner (sometimes a step and repeat wall or press wall) is a publicity backdrop used primarily for event photography, printed with a repeating pattern such that brand logos or emblems are visible in photographs of the individuals standing in front of it. Step and repeat banners are common fixtures of red carpet or fashion events.

The prototype is from the Academy Awards (Oscars) ceremony, where film stars step onto a red carpet, in front of a banner emblazoned with an image of the Oscar statuette, which is repeated with the next celebrities.

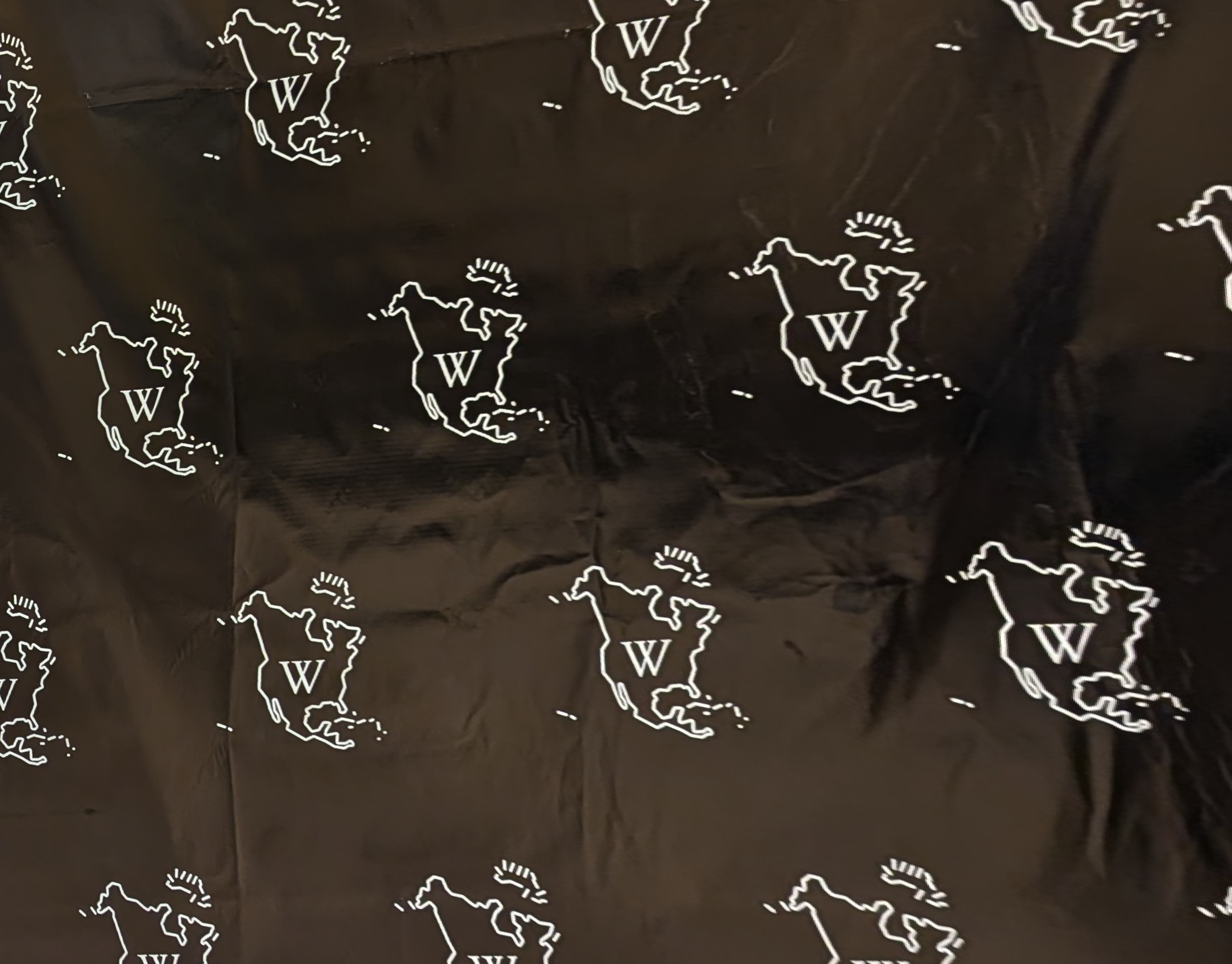
A step and repeat backdrop at WikiConference North America

Another version of the press wall is often seen in conventions and sports, where the same type of background with sponsor or team logos are utilized as the background for a press conference.

Like all design elements, a step and repeat can be unattractive. The 2023 Emmys had a notoriously ugly step and repeat, according to model Chrissy Teigen; a photographer agreed: "The backdrop was ugly ... I understand Fox and the Emmys want their signage, but less is more on the carpet."

The step and repeat has become a phenomenon, a "flex" and "a spectacle": "the backdrop for our memories."

== See also ==
- Dress code
- EGOT
