= 2018 Emmy Awards =

2018 Emmy Awards may refer to:

- 70th Primetime Emmy Awards, the 2018 Emmy Awards ceremony honoring primetime programming during June 2017 – May 2018
- 45th Daytime Emmy Awards, the 2018 Emmy Awards ceremony honoring daytime programming during 2017
- 46th International Emmy Awards, the 2018 ceremony honoring international programming

Preceded by 2017	Emmy Awards; 2018	Succeeded by 2019
