= Expo Village =

An Expo Village is an accommodation center built for the Universal Exposition organized by BIE in the host city. Expo Villages are built to house all participating delegates, as well as officials. Expo Villages are similar to Olympic Villages.

For example, the Expo Village for EXPO Milan 2015, the home of the foreign delegates attending the Expo in Milan, Italy, located in the seven towers of Cascina Merlata. Since its official opening, which took place March 9, 2015, for ten months, Expo Village has hosted over 5,000 delegates (60% men and 40% women) from 128 different countries who stayed in the seven towers constituting the complex. Among them were 468 artists of the countries invited by Expo 2015 to perform at their "National Days". The Milan Expo Village was managed by the Fondazione Collegio delle Università Milanesi, because of the expertise in temporary accommodation in international and multicultural environment.

== Related Pages ==
- Olympic Village
- Expo Shanghai 2010
- Expo Milan 2015
- Expo Antalya 2016
- Expo Astana 2017
- Expo Dubai 2020
