= 2022 Emmy Awards =

2022 Emmy Awards may refer to:

- 43rd Sports Emmy Awards, held on May 24, 2022, honoring sports programming.
- 49th Daytime Emmy Awards, held June 24, 2022, honoring daytime programming.
  - 49th Daytime Creative Arts & Lifestyle Emmy Awards, the separate Daytime Emmys ceremony held on June 18, 2022, to honor artistic and technical achievements in daytime programming.
- 74th Primetime Emmy Awards, held on September 12, 2022, honoring primetime programming.
  - 74th Primetime Creative Arts Emmy Awards, the separate Primetime Emmys ceremony held on September 3–4, 2022, to honor artistic and technical achievements in primetime programming.
- 43rd News and Documentary Emmy Awards, held on September 28–29, 2022, honoring news and documentary programming.
- 50th International Emmy Awards, held on November 21, 2022, honoring international programming.
- 1st Children's and Family Emmy Awards, held on December 10–11, 2022, honoring children's and family-oriented programming

Preceded by 2021	Emmy Awards; 2022	Succeeded by 2023
