= 2020 Emmy Awards =

2020 Emmy Awards may refer to:

- 72nd Primetime Emmy Awards, the 2020 Emmy Awards ceremony honoring primetime programming during June 2019 – May 2020
- 47th Daytime Emmy Awards, the 2020 Emmy Awards ceremony honoring daytime programming during 2020
- 48th International Emmy Awards, the 2020 Emmy Awards ceremony honoring international programming

Preceded by 2019	Emmy Awards; 2020	Succeeded by 2021
