= 2019 Emmy Awards =

2019 Emmy Awards may refer to:

- 71st Primetime Emmy Awards, the 2019 Emmy Awards ceremony honoring primetime programming during June 2018 – May 2019
- 46th Daytime Emmy Awards, the 2019 Emmy Awards ceremony honoring daytime programming during 2018
- 47th International Emmy Awards, the 2019 ceremony honoring international programming

Preceded by 2018	Emmy Awards; 2019	Succeeded by 2020
