= 2024 Emmy Awards =

2024 Emmy Awards may refer to:

Emmy ceremonies that were postponed from 2023 to 2024 due to Hollywood labor strikes

- 75th Primetime Emmy Awards, honoring primetime programming between June 2022 and May 2023, was moved to January 15, 2024
  - 75th Primetime Creative Arts Emmy Awards, the separate Primetime Emmys ceremony to honor artistic and technical achievements in primetime programming between June 2022 and May 2023, was pushed to January 6–7, 2024.

Regularly scheduled 2024 ceremonies

- 45th Sports Emmy Awards, honoring sports programming, was held on May 21, 2024.
- 51st Daytime Emmy Awards, honoring daytime programming in 2023, was held on June 7, 2024.
  - 51st Daytime Creative Arts & Lifestyle Emmy Awards, the separate Daytime Emmys ceremony to honor artistic and technical achievements in daytime programming, was held on June 8, 2024.
- 76th Primetime Emmy Awards, honoring primetime programming between June 2023 and May 2024, was held on September 15, 2024.
  - 76th Primetime Creative Arts Emmy Awards, the separate Primetime Emmys ceremony to honor artistic and technical achievements in primetime programming between June 2023 and May 2024, was held on September 7–8, 2024.
- 45th News and Documentary Emmy Awards, honoring American news and documentary programming in 2023, was held on September 25–26, 2024.
- 52nd International Emmy Awards, honoring international programming in 2023, was held on November 25, 2024.

Ceremony moved to 2025

- 3rd Children's and Family Emmy Awards, honoring children's and family-oriented television programming, was pushed to March 15, 2025, marking a permanent move for these awards from December to the Spring

Preceded by 2023	Emmy Awards; 2024	Succeeded by 2025
