= 2021 Emmy Awards =

2021 Emmy Awards may refer to:

- 42nd Sports Emmy Awards, held on June 8, 2021, honoring sports programming.
- 48th Daytime Emmy Awards, held on June 25, 2021, honoring daytime programming.
- 73rd Primetime Emmy Awards, held on September 19, 2021, honoring primetime programming.
- 42nd News & Documentary Emmy Awards, held on September 28–29, 2021, honoring news and documentary programming
- 49th International Emmy Awards, held on November 22, 2021, honoring international programming.

Preceded by 2020	Emmy Awards; 2021	Succeeded by 2022
