= Happy Channel =

Happy Channel may refer to:

- Happy Channel (Italian TV channel)
- Happy Channel (Romanian TV channel)
