= Expo 2015 =

World expo held in Milan, Italy

2015 Milan
- Logo

Overview
- BIE-class: Universal exposition
- Category: International Registered Exhibition
- Name: Expo Milano 2015
- Motto: Feeding the Planet, Energy for Life
- Area: 200 hectares (490 acres)
- Visitors: 22,200,000
- Mascot: Foody

Participant(s)
- Countries: 147
- Organizations: 16
- Business: 21

Location
- Country: Italy
- City: Milan
- Venue: Fiera Milano, Rho
- Coordinates: 45°31′7″N 9°6′24″E

Timeline
- Awarded: March 31, 2008
- Opening: May 1, 2015
- Closure: October 31, 2015

Universal expositions
- Previous: Expo 2010 in Shanghai
- Next: Expo 2020 in Dubai

Specialized expositions
- Previous: Expo 2012 in Yeosu
- Next: Expo 2017 in Astana

Horticultural expositions
- Previous: Floriade 2012 in Venlo
- Next: Expo 2016 in Antalya

Internet
- Website: expo2015.org

Expo 2015 was a World Expo hosted by Milan, Italy. It opened on May 1, 2015 at 10:00 CEST and closed on October 31, 2015. This was the second time Milan hosted an exposition; the first time was the 1906 Milan International. Expo 2015's theme was "Feeding the Planet, Energy for Life".

== Bidding process ==
Milan bid against the city of İzmir in Turkey for the right to host Expo 2015. Toronto had previously been a candidate, but it withdrew in 2006 due to a lack of financial support from the municipal government. The Bureau International des Expositions (BIE) general assembly in Paris decided in favour of Milan on March 31, 2008. The first ballot was annulled because of difficulties with the voting system, and on the second ballot Milan received 86 votes over İzmir's 65. On November 23, 2010, the event was registered by the BIE.

== Themes ==
Expo 2015's theme was "Feeding the Planet, Energy for Life", encompassing technology, innovation, culture, traditions and creativity and how they relate to food and diet. The exposition developed themes introduced in earlier expos (such as water at Expo 2008 in Zaragoza) in light of new global scenarios and emerging issues, focusing on the right to healthy, secure and sufficient food for the world's inhabitants. Futuristic concerns about food security are compounded by forecasts of increasing uncertainty about the quantity of food which will be available globally. The exposition had seven sub-themes:

- Science for food safety, security and quality
- Innovation in the agro-food supply chain
- Technology for agriculture and biodiversity
- Dietary education
- Solidarity and cooperation on food
- Food for better lifestyles
- Food in the world's cultures and ethnic groups

== Site ==
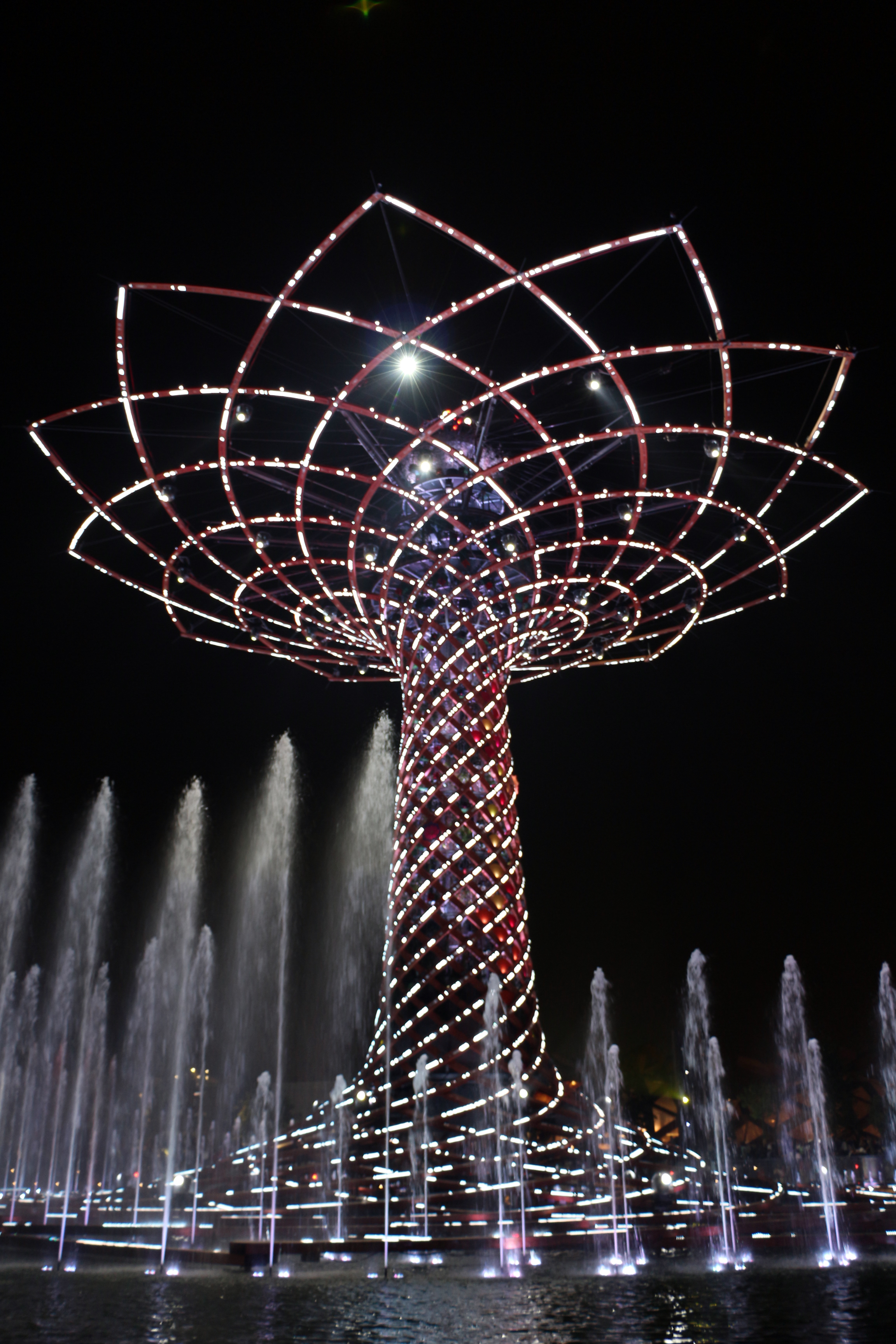
Albero della vita (Tree of Life)

The Expo 2015 site is about 15 kilometres (9.3 mi) northwest of Milan, in the municipalities of Rho and Pero, and covers an area of 1.1 km^{2} (0.42 sq mi). It is adjacent to the Fiera Milano fairgrounds, designed by Massimiliano Fuksas, which may be considered the cornerstone of the area's urban redevelopment. It had long been an industrial zone before its conversion to logistical and municipal services and agriculture. The fairgrounds and the Expo site were connected by a pedestrian bridge adjacent to the Rho-Pero high-speed rail station. Originally-planned bicycle paths were never constructed, and several motorways were built (or expanded) to allow access to the site.

The area is oblong in shape with an overall length of nearly 3 km (1.9 mi), suggesting a boulevard along which the pavilions would be located. The design of pools and waterways in and around the Expo area was an element of primary importance.

=== Initial plan ===
Expo 2015 bid logo

The initial plan had the following elements:

- 50 per cent of the area occupied by pavilions, 35 per cent dedicated to space around each pavilion and the remaining 15 per cent a green perimeter around the site
- Piazza Italia and Piazza Expo at either end of the main boulevard, the former dominated by the 7,000-square-metre (1.7-acre) Italy pavilion and flanked by a second square (Piazza delle Regioni)
- A large, artificial lake surrounded by the 20 pavilions representing the Italian regions
- A 12,000-seat amphitheatre covering 9,000 m^{2} (2.2 acres) and a 6,000-seat, 6,000-square-metre (1.5-acre) auditorium
- Country pavilions in three sizes, depending on the financial resources of the participating country
- Three pavilions dedicated to geographic areas: Asia, Africa and Latin America and the Caribbean

A 100-hectare (250-acre) service area was planned near the main Expo site with hotels, parking facilities, stores, a convention centre, green areas, a business centre available to Expo participants and a 12-hectare (30-acre) Expo Village to house staff, volunteers and security and administrative personnel.

The following thematic pavilions were also planned:

- What the World Eats: At the base of the Expo tower and in the pedestrian bridge connecting the Rho-Pero fairgrounds to the expo site
- Science and Conscience
- Tales of Land, Air and Water
- The Food Spiral
- The Right to Eat Well
- In the Realm of the Senses, in Piazza Italia
- Equilibrium
- The Art of Food

=== Concept ===
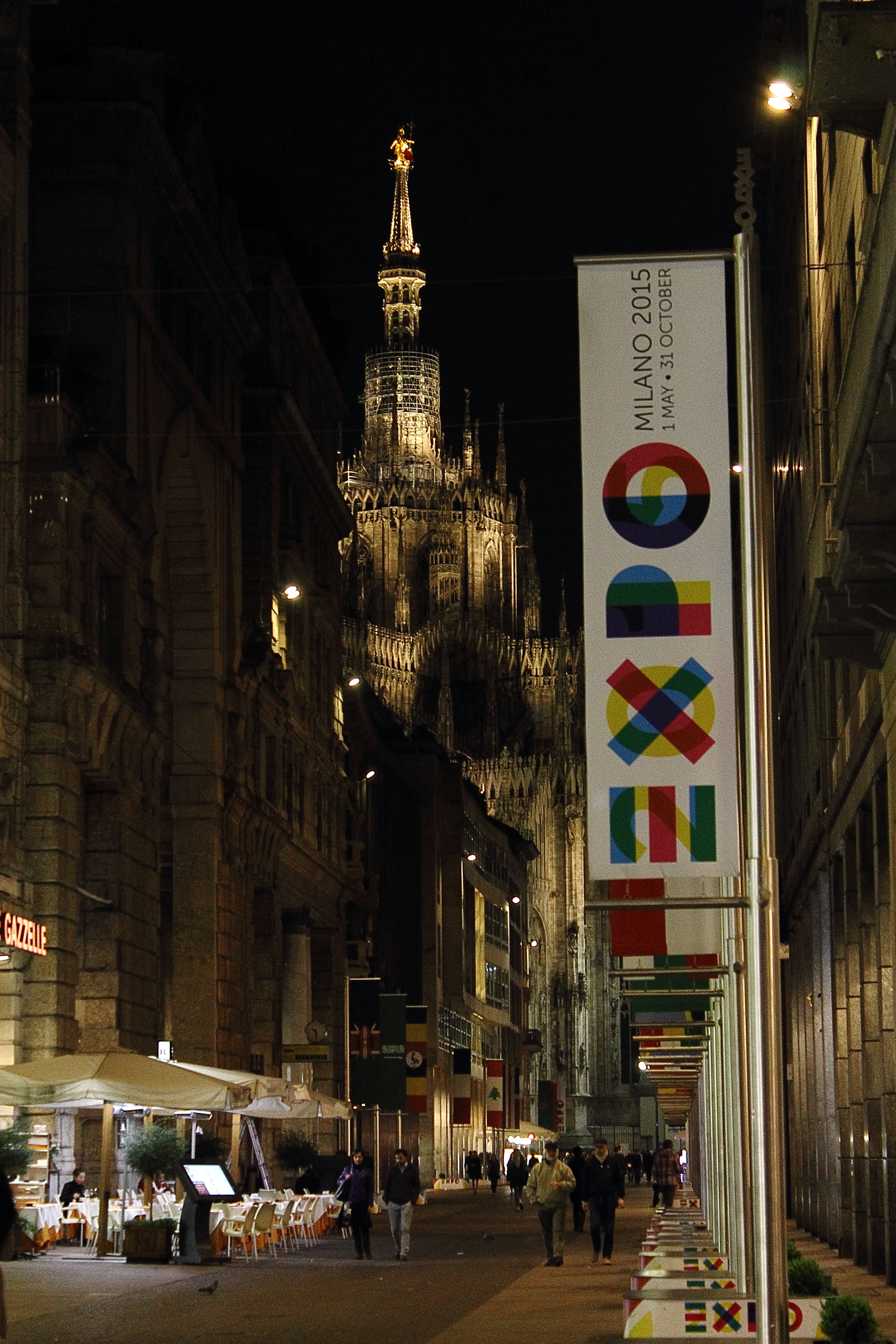
Expo 2015 logo in Corso Vittorio Emanuele II in Milan

Expo 2015's concept was presented on September 8, 2009. It was designed by a committee of four architects: Stefano Boeri, Richard Burdett, Mark Rylander and Jacques Herzog.

The main idea was to trace two avenues (a main and a secondary avenue), representing the ancient Roman layout of a cardo and a decumanus. The initial idea of a "classical" site composed of avenues and pavilions was replaced by the idea of a "light" Expo composed of exhibition areas arranged across the main boulevard. The exhibition areas, identical for each country, recreated the typical food cycle of each nation from production to consumption. The centre of the avenue was occupied by a table in front of the country pavilions extending the length of the site, where visitors could sample foods produced in each country's pavilion. The area would be covered by large, tent-like structures to convey the idea of a global marketplace.

A second idea was to build large greenhouses on the site to reproduce the earth's principal biomes. These would be thematic pavilions for the cultivation and production of basic foodstuffs used in the individual country pavilions. Each country would have a dedicated greenhouse in its exhibition area. In this version of the site, water remained an important element but was shifted toward the exterior as a large, navigable canal surrounding the site. A large lake was also included in the design. Additional elements included a large, excavated amphitheatre and a hill, one at each end of the boulevard; expo village facilities across the encircling canal from the site, and redevelopment of the post-office building as a centre for sustainable development.

=== Master plan ===
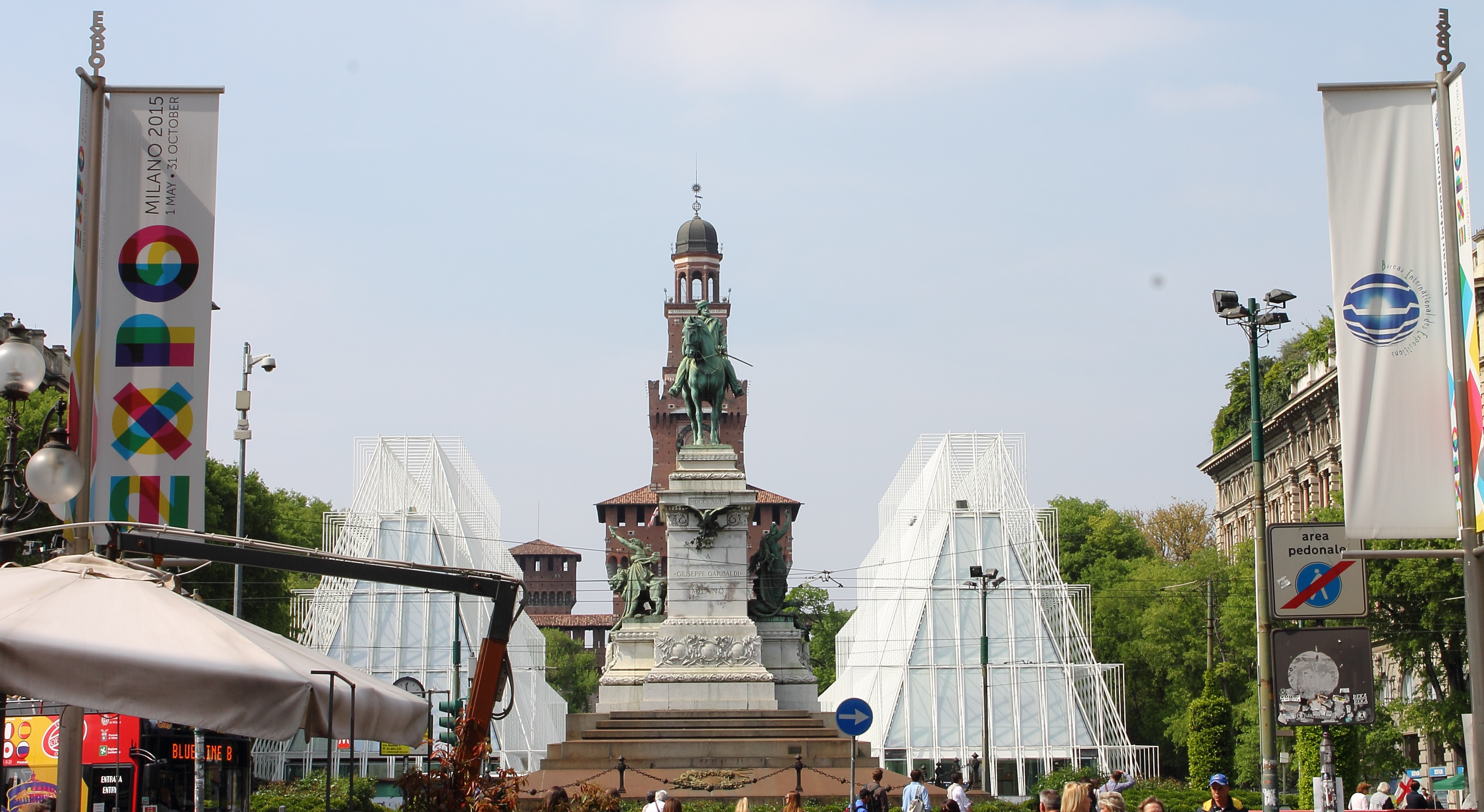
Expo gate in Piazza Castello

The master plan for Expo 2015, coordinated by Stefano Boeri, was delivered to the BIE during its April 30, 2010 registration ceremony in Paris. Changes included:

- Each exhibiting country could rent areas ranging from 400 to 6,000 m^{2} (4,300 to 64,600 sq ft).
- Buildable areas were reduced to 30 per cent of the area assigned to each exhibitor.
- The large, but not navigable, canal around the area is maintained;
- The tent roofing remained only along the axes of the cardo and the decumanus.
- Greenhouses would be in a 50,000 m^{2} (12-acre) zone.
- The circular canal became a theatre on the water, with a central stage.
- The green hill opposite the amphitheatre would be built of earth from the amphitheatre excavation.
- An auditorium was included.

== Participants ==
Expo participants included 145 countries, three international organizations and several civil society organizations, corporations and non-governmental organizations (NGOs). Participants were hosted in individual or grouped pavilions.

=== Countries ===
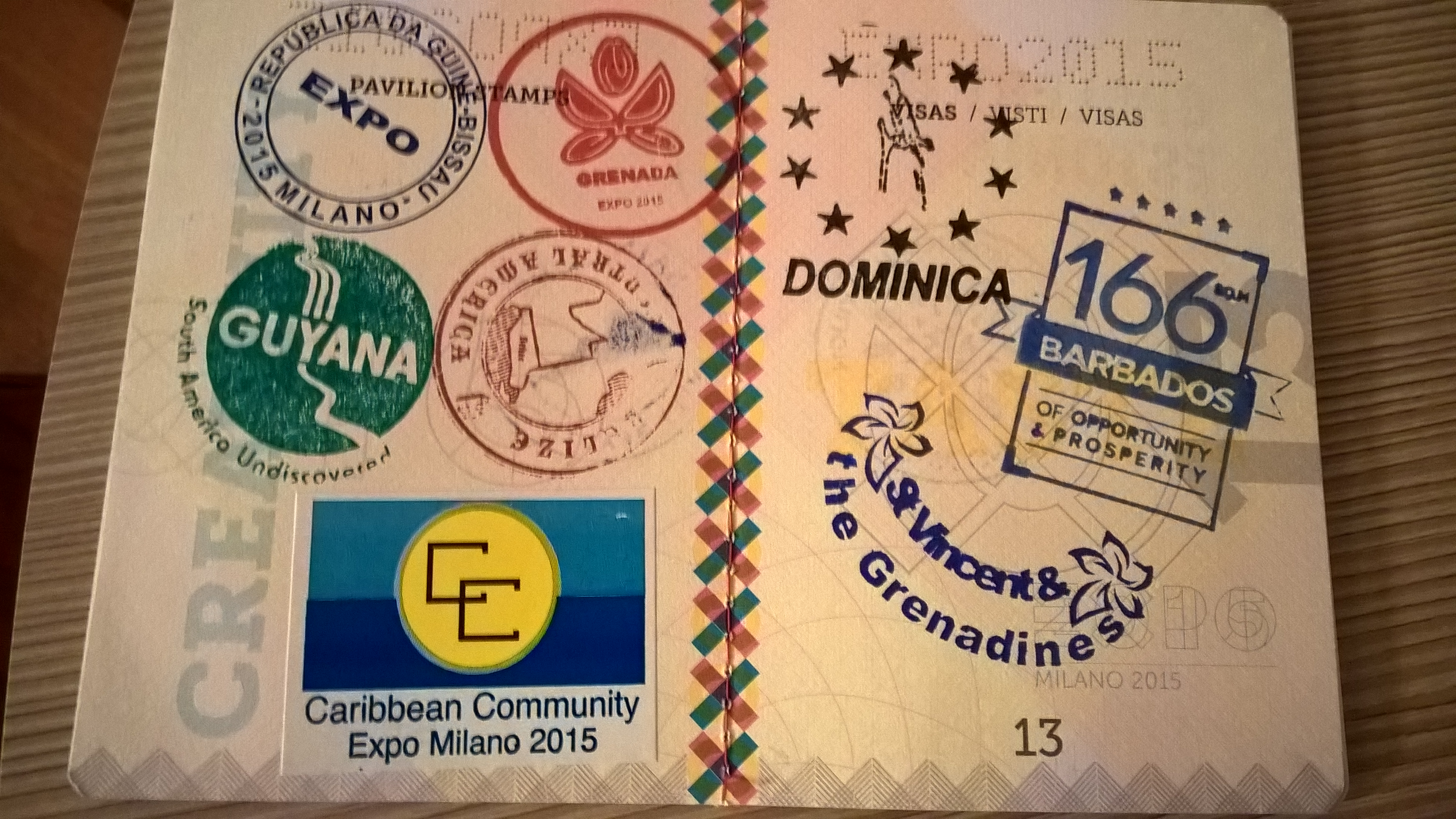
Expo passport

Each participating country was hosted in a self-constructed pavilion and included on the Expo website. Some countries, such as Belarus, Belgium, Israel and Germany, created external websites. As part of a reciprocity protocol with Expo 2010 in Shanghai, on December 8, 2008, the People's Republic of China was the first country to formalise its participation in Expo 2015. The first country outside the reciprocity protocol to confirm its participation was Switzerland, on February 3, 2011. As in other years, during the Expo visitors could purchase a passport which could be stamped.

Two major countries which did not participate were Australia and Canada, who withdrew despite participating in the previous Expo in Shanghai, citing budgetary restrictions.

The following countries participated:

- Islamic Republic of Afghanistan
- Albania
- Algeria
- Angola
- Argentina
- Armenia
- Austria
- Azerbaijan
- Bahrain
- Bangladesh
- Belarus
- Belgium
- Benin
- Bolivia
- Bosnia and Herzegovina
- Brazil
- Brunei
- Burundi
- Cambodia
- Cameroon
- Cape Verde
- Central African Republic
- Chile
- People's Republic of China
- Colombia
- Comoros
- Republic of the Congo
- Croatia
- Cuba
- Czech Republic
- Democratic Republic of the Congo
- Djibouti
- Dominica
- Dominican Republic
- Ecuador
- Egypt
- El Salvador
- Equatorial Guinea
- Eritrea
- Estonia
- Ethiopia
- France
- Gabon
- Gambia
- Georgia
- Germany
- Ghana
- Greece
- Grenada
- Guatemala
- Guinea
- Guinea-Bissau
- Haiti
- Holy See
- Honduras
- Hungary
- India
- Indonesia
- Iran
- Ireland
- Israel
- Italy
- Ivory Coast
- Japan
- Kazakhstan
- Kenya
- Kuwait
- Kyrgyzstan
- Laos
- Lebanon
- Lithuania
- Madagascar
- Malaysia
- Maldives
- Malta
- Mauritania
- Mexico
- Moldova
- Monaco
- Montenegro
- Morocco
- Mozambique
- Nepal
- Netherlands
- North Korea
- Oman
- Poland
- Qatar
- Romania
- Russia
- Rwanda
- San Marino
- São Tomé and Príncipe
- Senegal
- Serbia
- Sierra Leone
- Slovakia
- Slovenia
- Somalia
- South Korea (as Republic of Korea)
- Spain
- Sri Lanka
- Switzerland
- Tanzania
- Thailand
- Timor-Leste
- Togo
- Tunisia
- Turkey
- Turkmenistan
- Uganda
- United Arab Emirates
- United Kingdom
- United States
- Uruguay
- Uzbekistan
- Vanuatu
- Venezuela
- Vietnam
- Yemen
- Zambia
- Zimbabwe
- Sovereign Military Order of Malta

=== Nongovernmental organizations and countries with limited recognition ===
- Republic of China
- ActionAid
- Cesvi
- Amity University
- Andrea Bocelli Foundation
- Caritas Internationalis
- Cibus-Federalimentare
- Don Bosco Network
- Fairtrade International
- Fondazione Triulza
- KIP International School
- Lions Clubs International
- National Observatory for Women's Health
- Oxfam International
- Save the Children
- Venerable Factory of the Duomo of Milan
- WAA-AMIA/CONAF
- World Wide Fund for Nature

=== International organizations ===
- CERN
- European Union
- United Nations

=== Companies ===
- China Corporate United Pavilion
- Coca-Cola
- Joomoo
- New Holland Agriculture
- Vanke

== Agreements ==
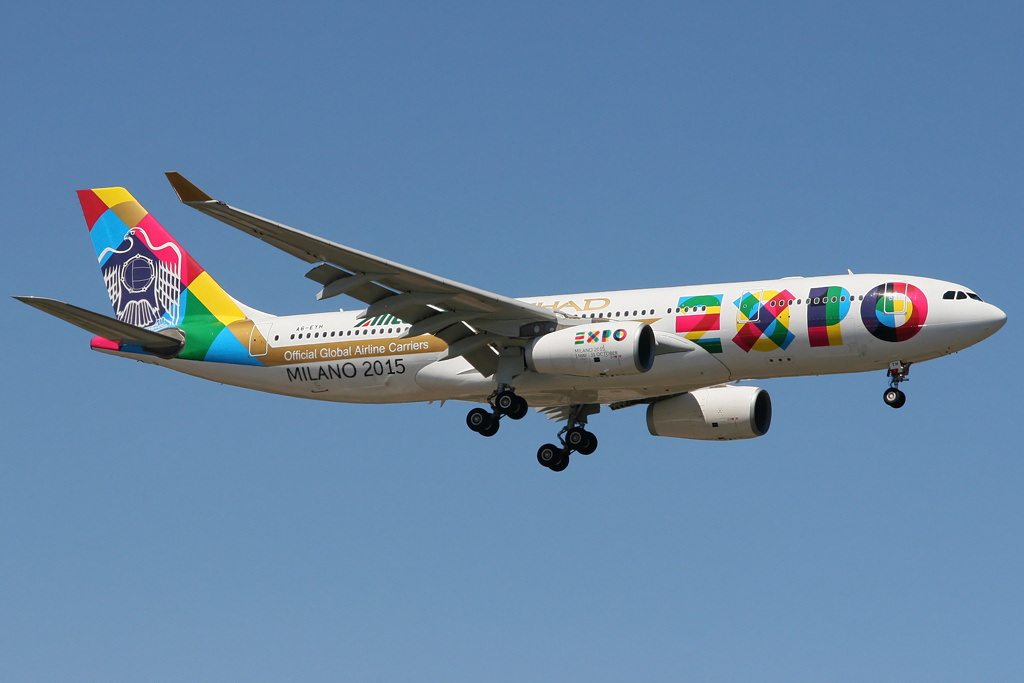
An Etihad Airbus A330 aircraft, A6-EYH, in Expo 2015 and Alitalia livery

In preparation for Expo 2015, the City of Milan signed coordination agreements with other cities in Italy and Europe focusing on tourism, culture and infrastructure. Agreements were also signed with other countries for the development of projects associated with food and education.

== Partners ==
Sponsors of Expo 2015
Official Global Partners
- Accenture
- Alitalia-Etihad Airways
- Enel
- Fiat Chrysler Automobiles-CNH Industrial
- Finmeccanica (Selex ES)
- Intesa Sanpaolo
- Samsung Electronics
- Telecom Italia
- Trenitalia
Official Premium Partners
- Coop
- ManpowerGroup
Official Partners
- Birra Moretti-Partesa
- BolognaFiere
- Came
- Cassa Depositi e Prestiti-Fondo Strategico Italiano-SACE
- Cisco
- Coca-Cola
- Eni
- Eutelsat
- Ferrero SpA
- Fiera Milano
- Huiyuan Juice
- Illy
- Sicilian Region
- S.Pellegrino
- Technogym
- Unilever (Algida)
Other Partners
- Allianz
- Birrificio Angelo Poretti
- Canon Inc.
- Eataly
- Excelsior Milano
- Franciacorta DOCG
- Gewiss
- Granarolo
- Lavazza
- Martini & Rossi
- McDonald's
- MSC Cruises
- OVS Industry
- RAI
- Swatch

== Protests ==
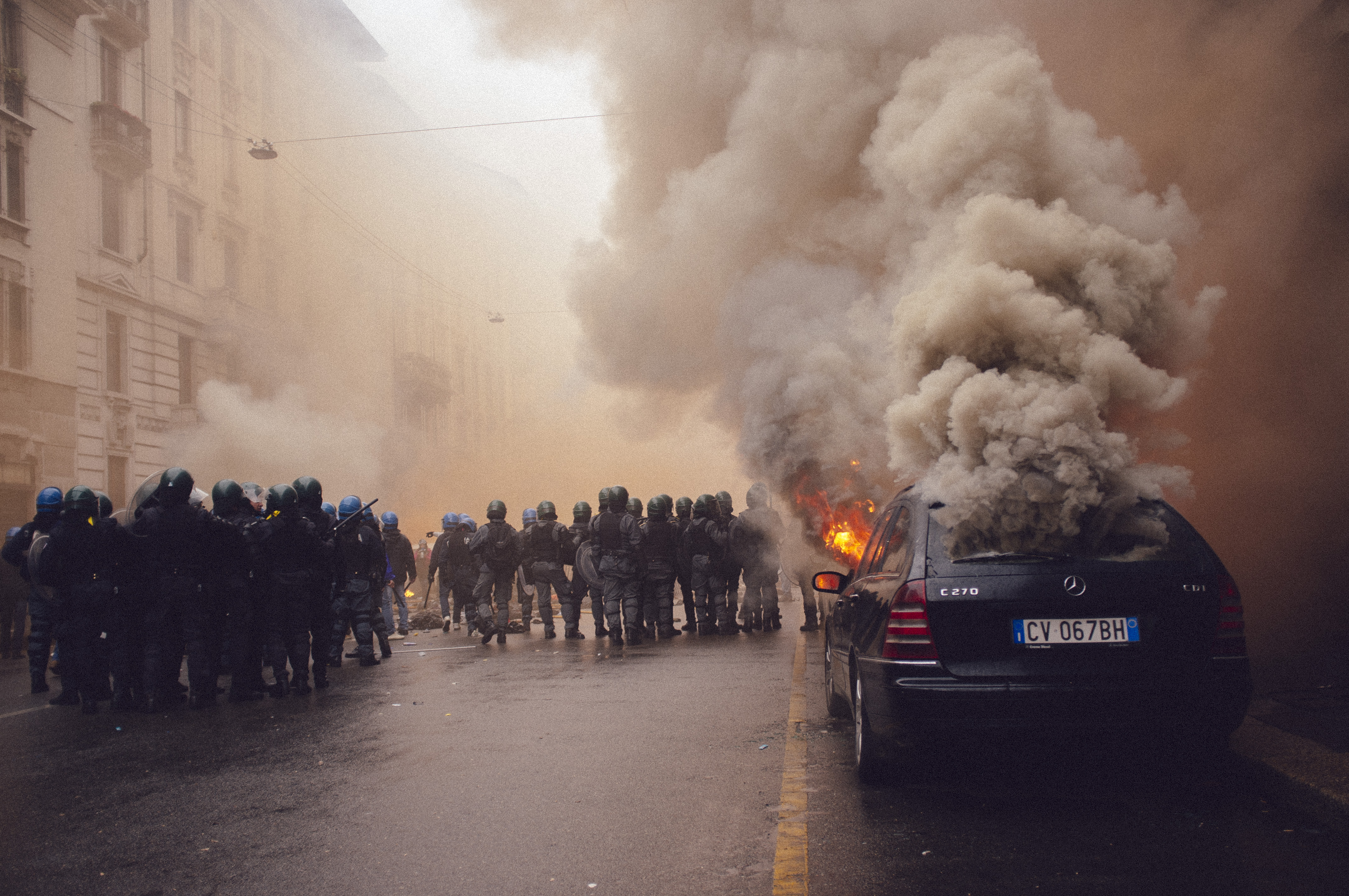
Protest in Milan on the exposition's first day

Expo 2015's opening on May 1 was met with protests by a black bloc of anti-austerity activists, with police using tear gas. Although Vatican City invested €3 million in its pavilion before Pope Francis' election, he said that it was good for the church to be involved in causes which fight hunger and promote clean energy but too much money was wasted on the Expo by the Vatican.

== Food ==
Several unusual (or unique) food choices were offered during the exposition, some normally not permitted in Italy. At Zimbabwe's pavilion, visitors could try burgers made from crocodile, zebra or python (named "crocoburger", "zebraburger" and "savanaburger" by their creator, consul Georges El Badaoui). The pavilion's food was some of the expo's most innovative and extravagant. At the Japanese pavilion during the expo, European regulations were relaxed and it was possible to taste sashimi from pufferfish (fugu). In the Future Food District were packs of canned insects, common in Southeast Asia but prohibited in the European Union. Italian chef Massimo Bottura and international colleagues created the Refettorio Ambrosiano, a gourmet soup kitchen using waste food from the fair.

== Verybello.it ==
verybello.it was the Italian website for the Expo 2015. The website was launched in January 2015. Its early version attracted criticism for omitting Sicily from the map of Italy, and for having only the Italian language version present. The website's design and name were also criticized.

The website, as accessed in late March 2015, had an English version, and an expanded map including Sicily.

== Sport ==
World Cup Expo, a football tournament of mixed teams composed of workers from individual pavilions (or clusters), was held during the event.

== Mascot ==
The mascot was Foody, a salad-like character, inspired by the work of Giuseppe Arcimboldo and is composed of eleven different foods, each of which forms a separate mascot, including Chicca the pomegranate. It was designed by The Walt Disney Company Italy.

== Pavilions ==
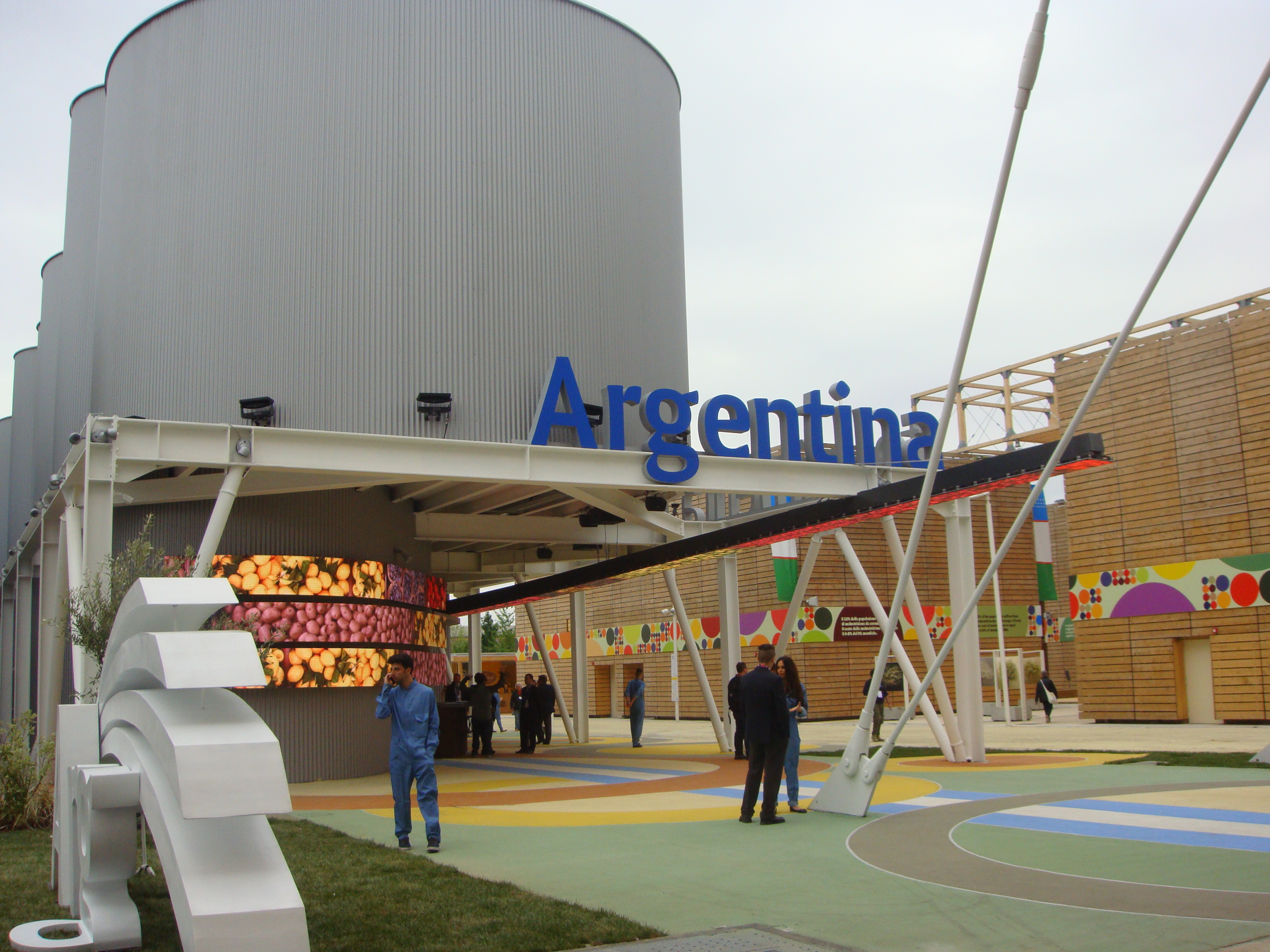
Argentina

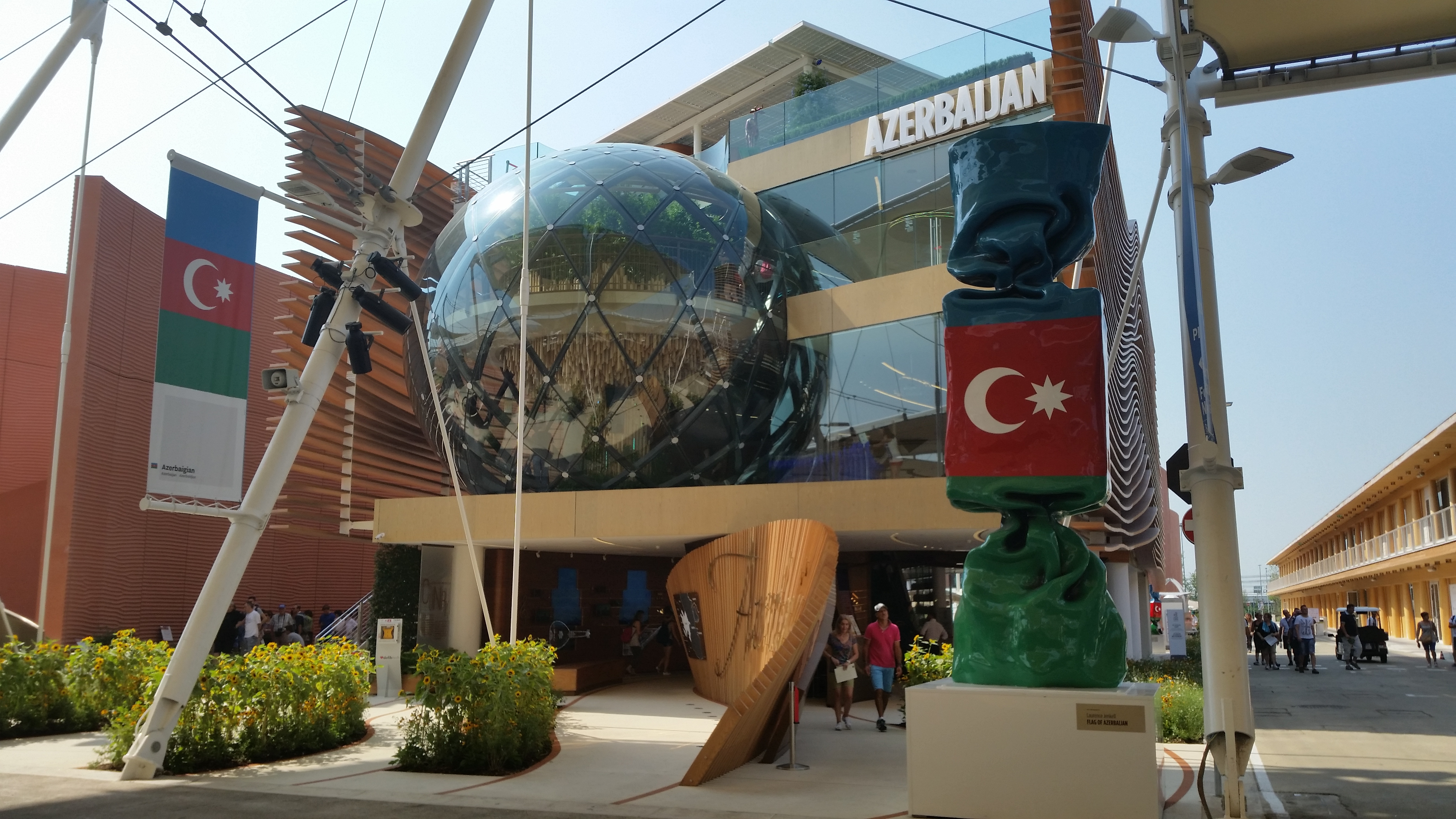
Azerbaijan

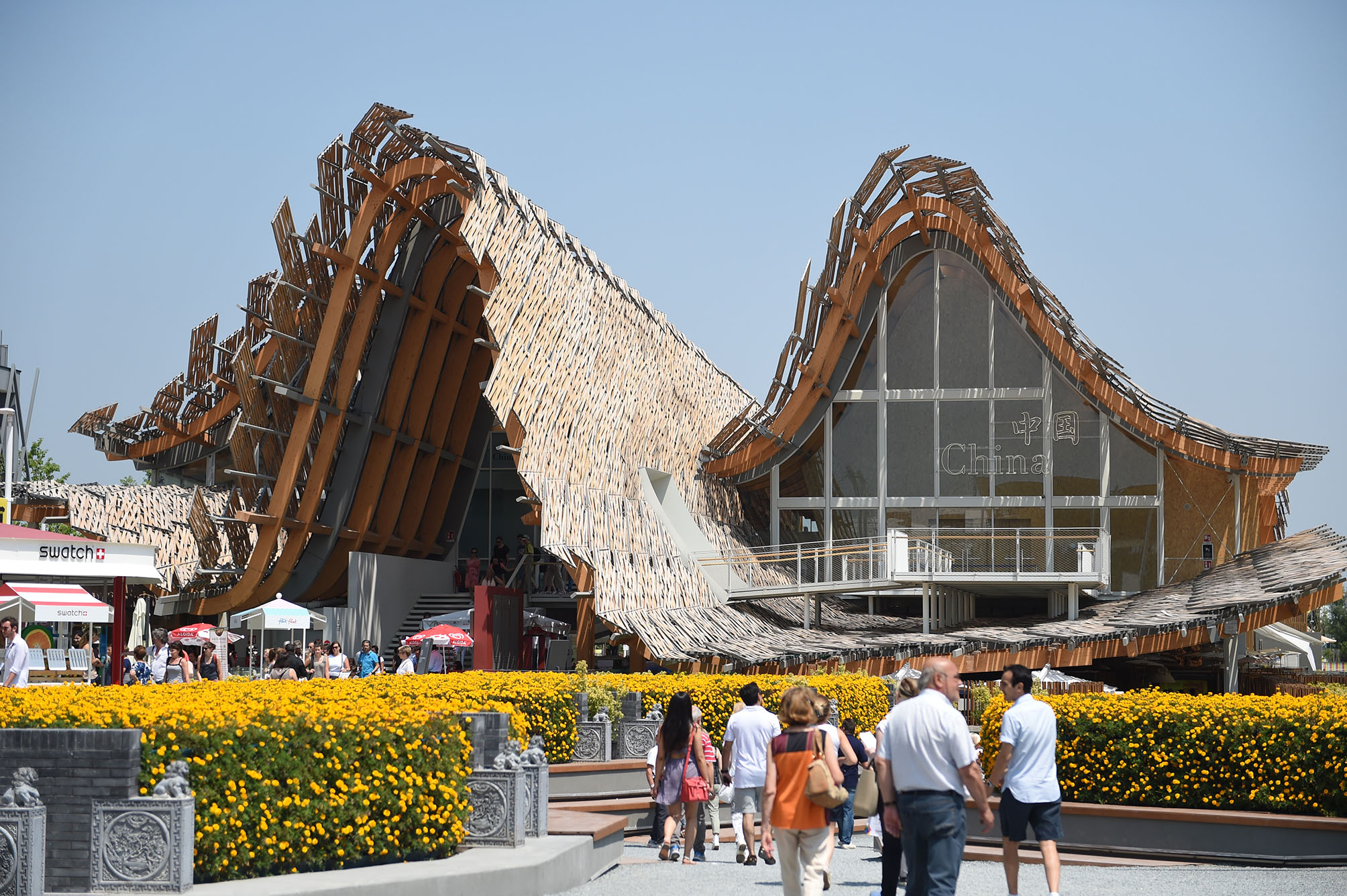
Mainland China

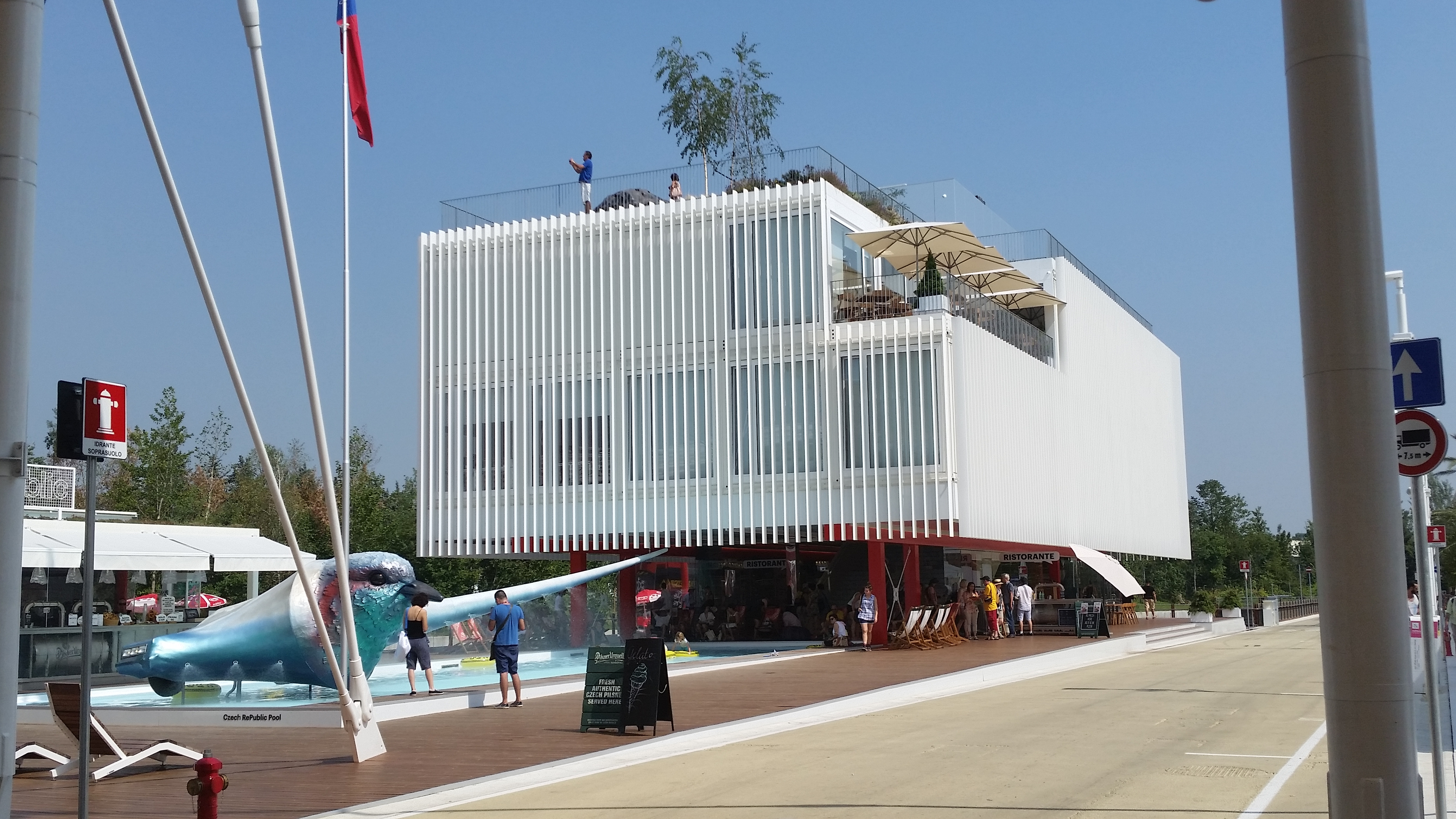
Czech Republic

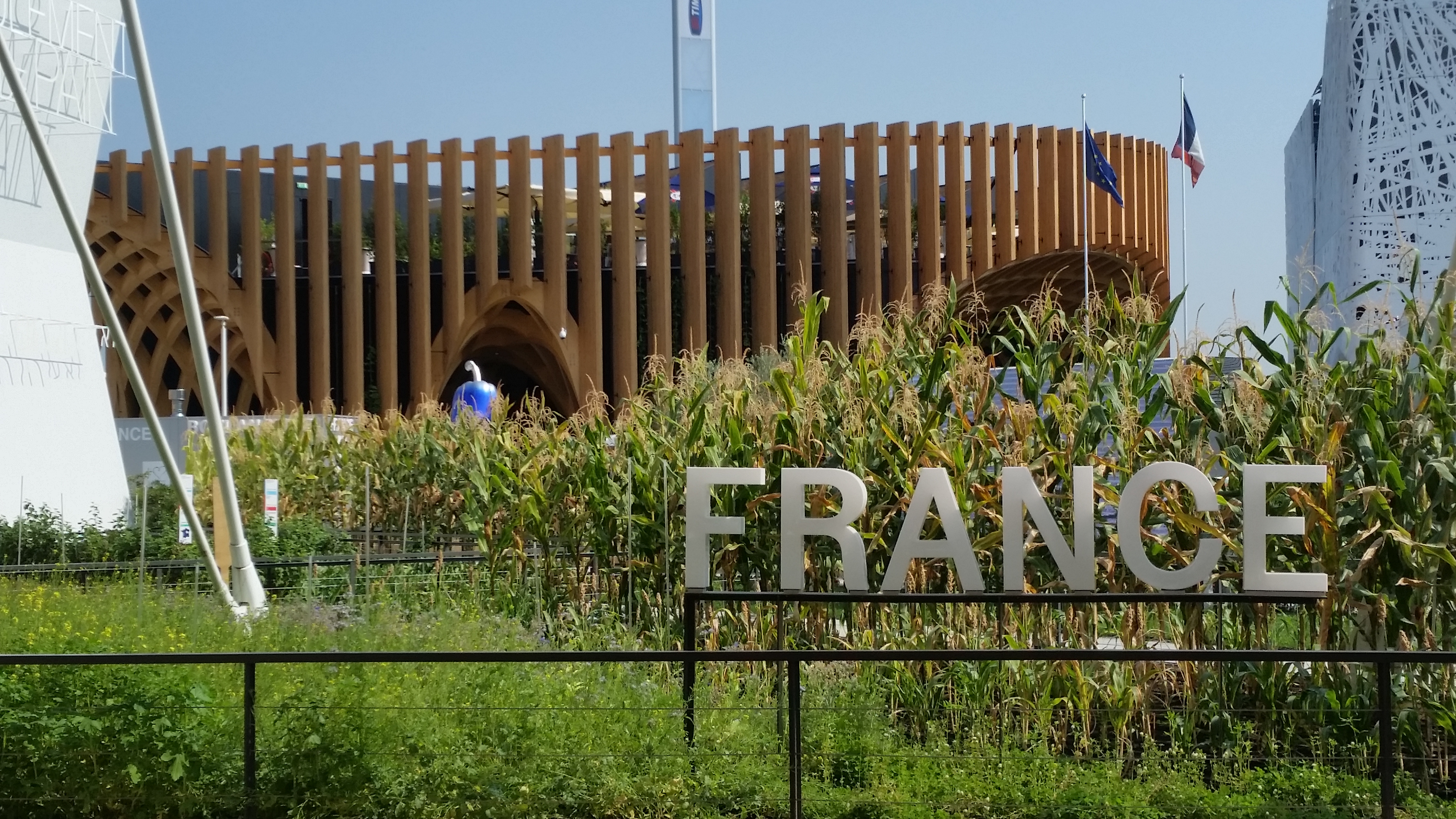
France

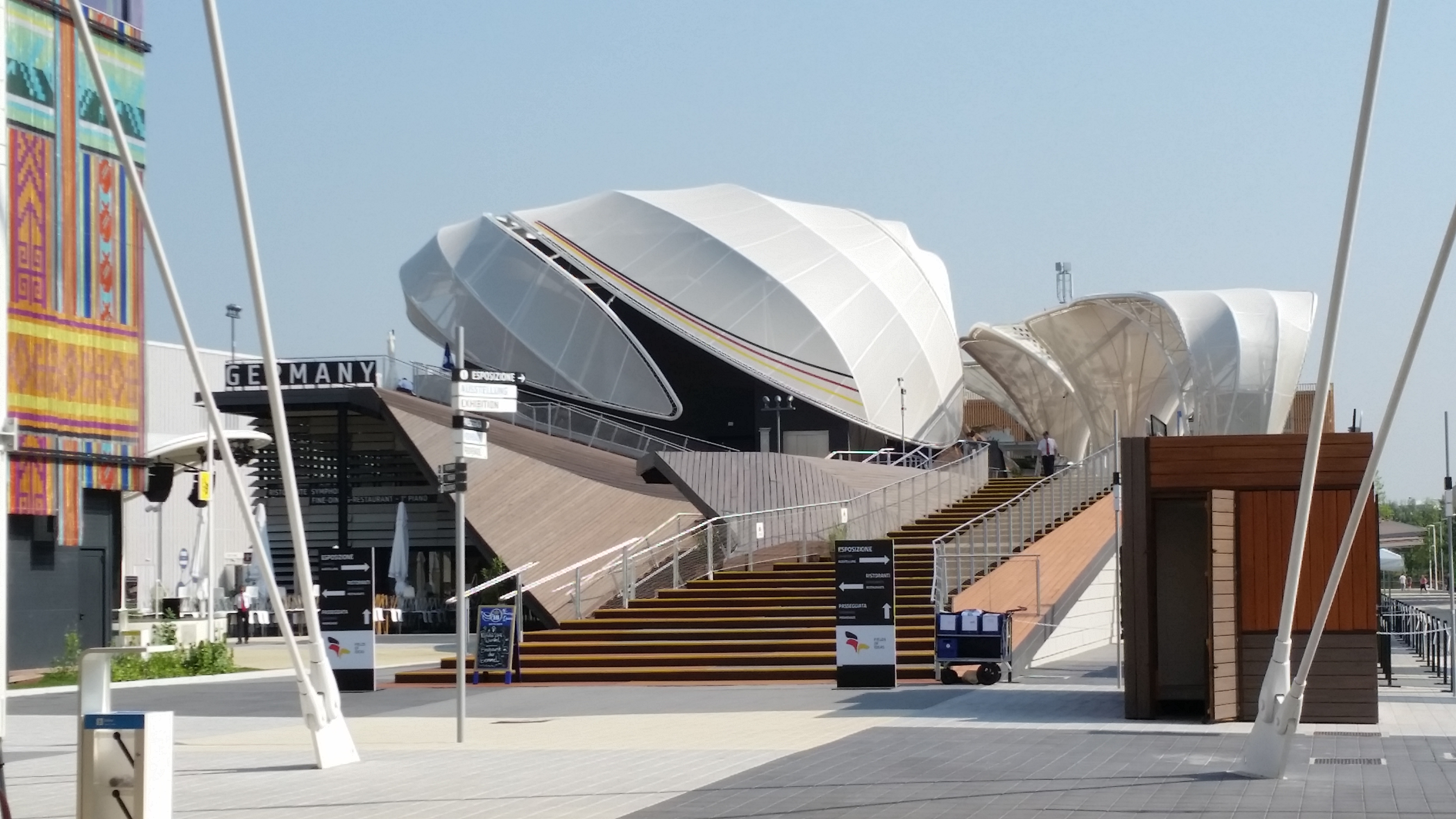
Germany

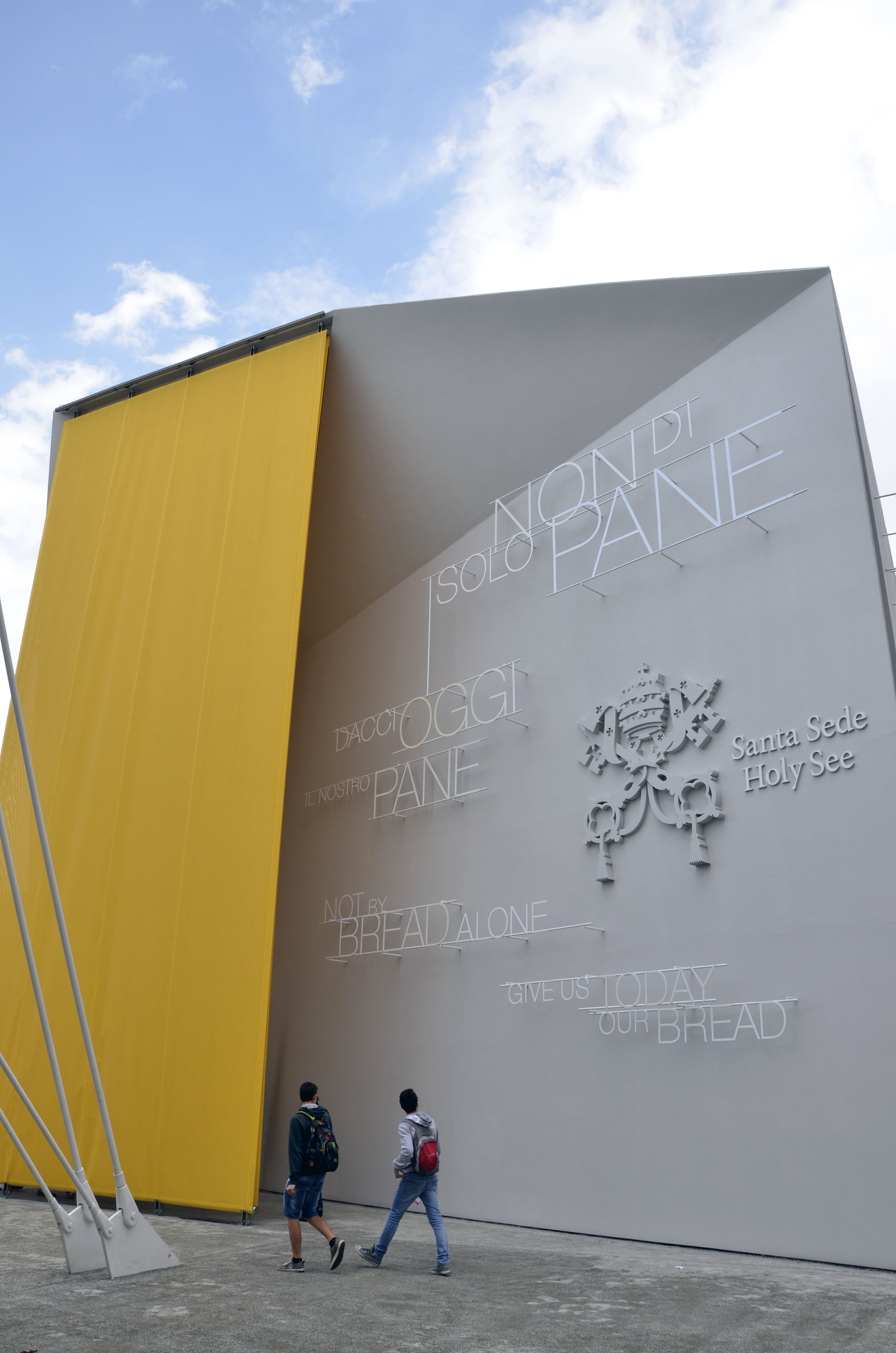
Holy See

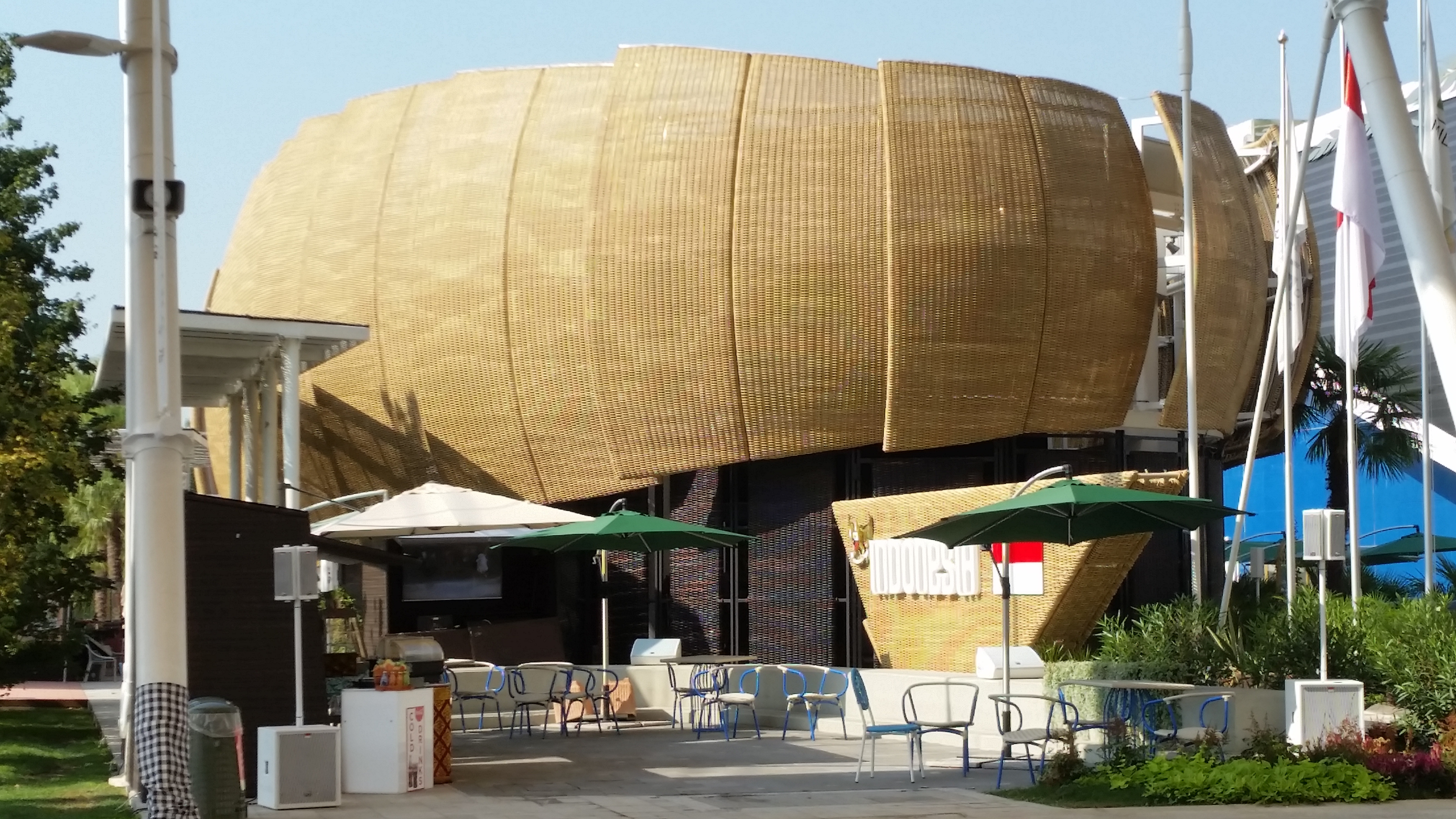
Indonesia

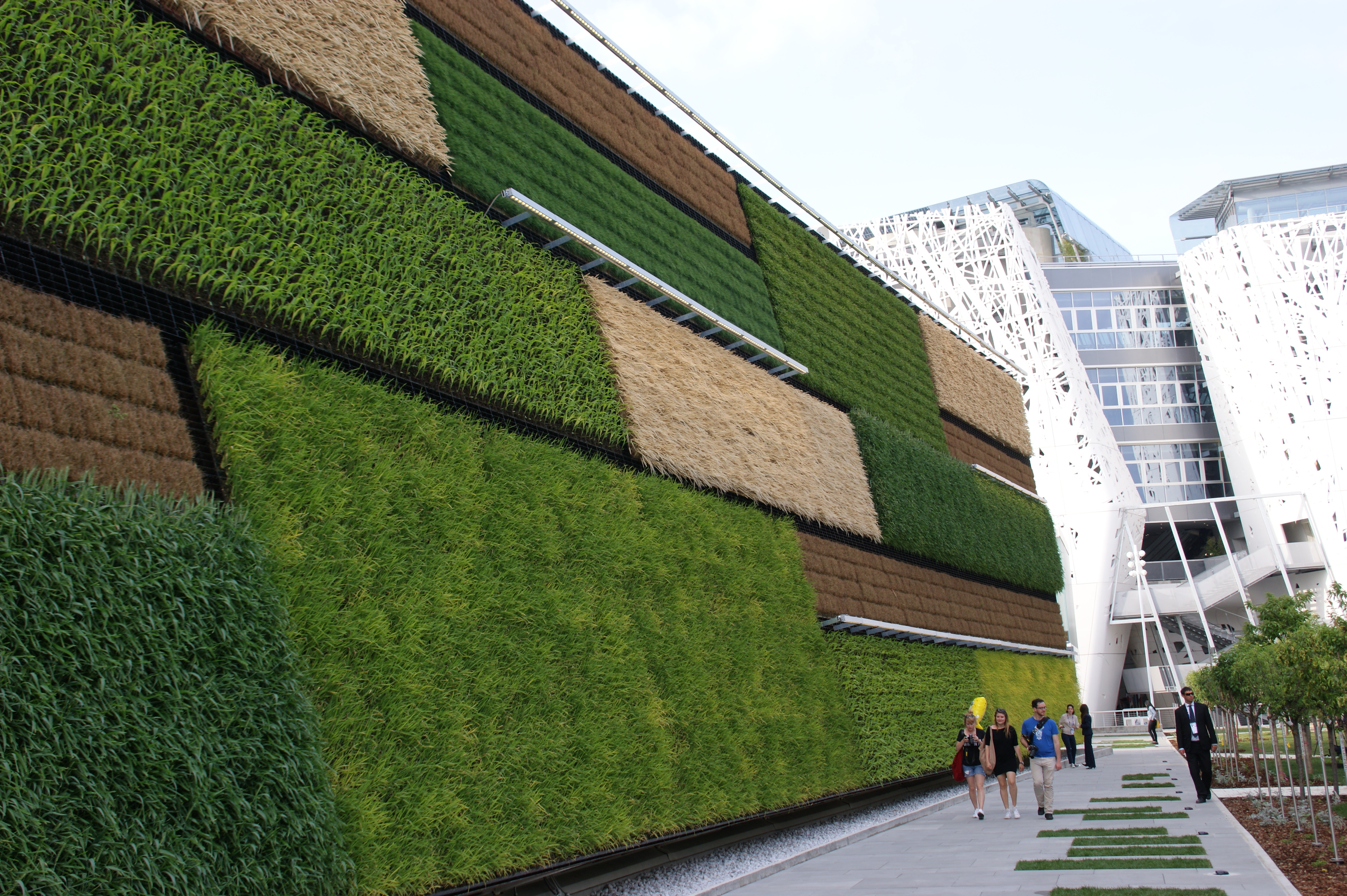
Israel

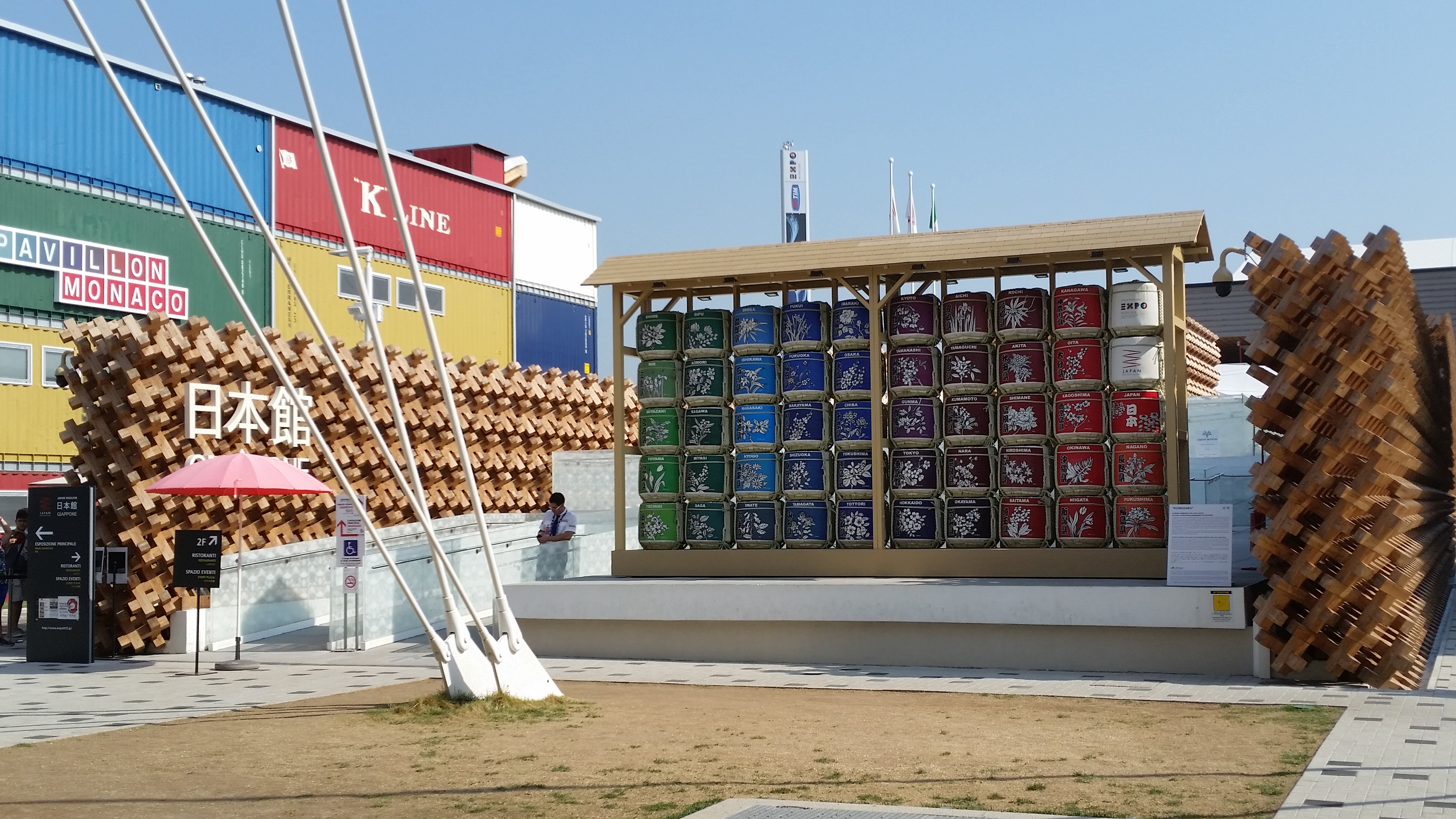
Japan

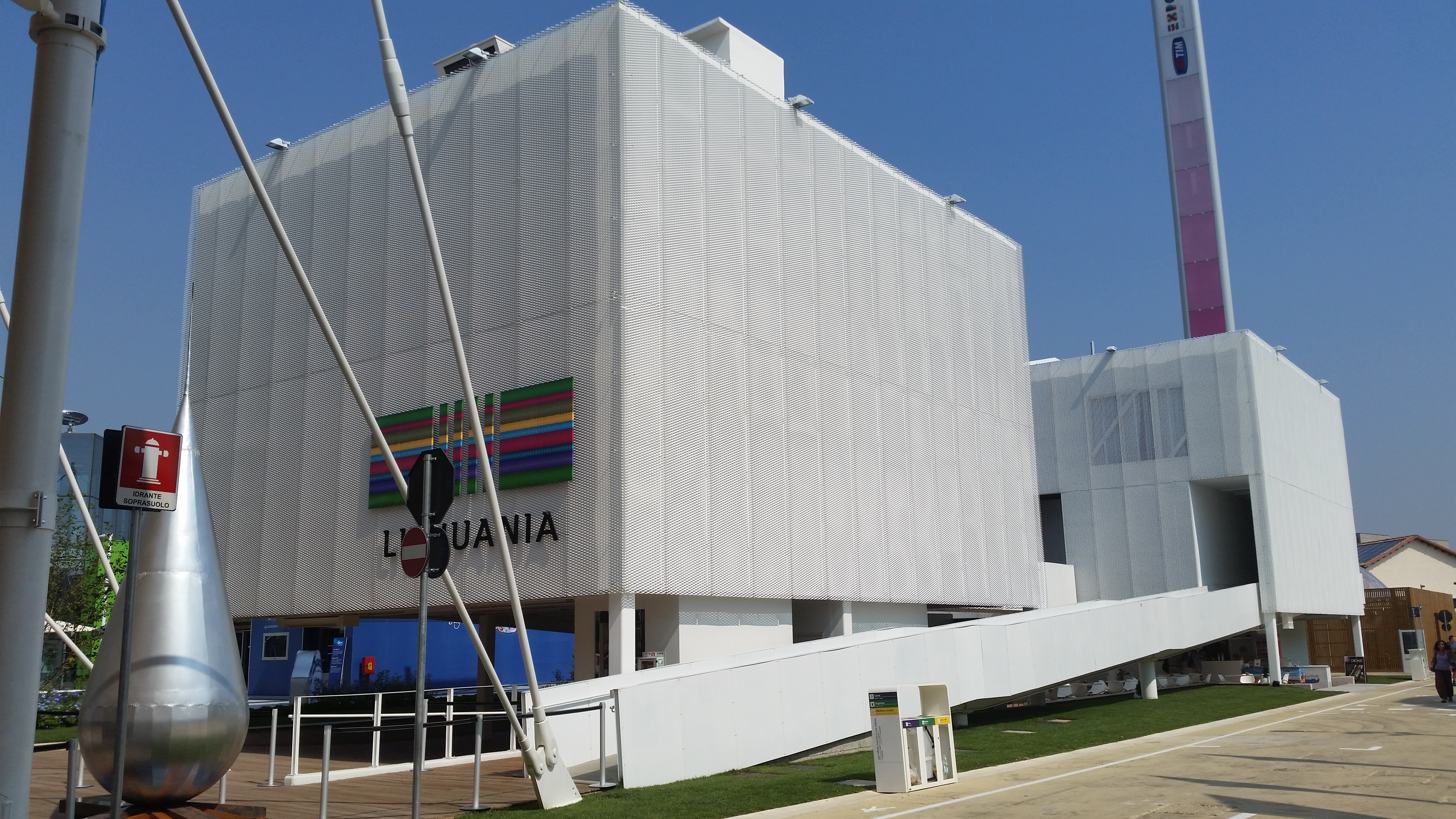
Lithuania

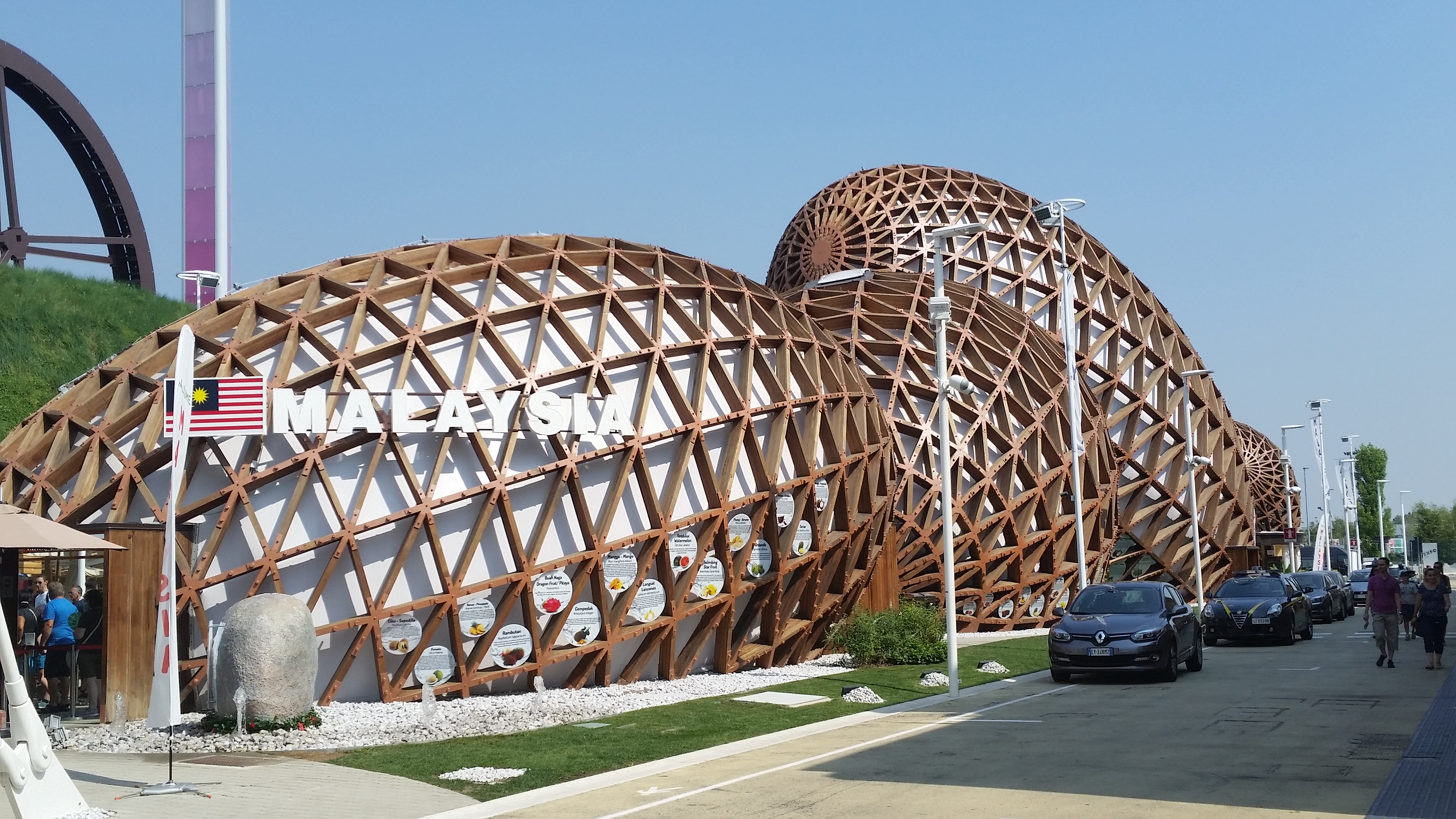
Malaysia

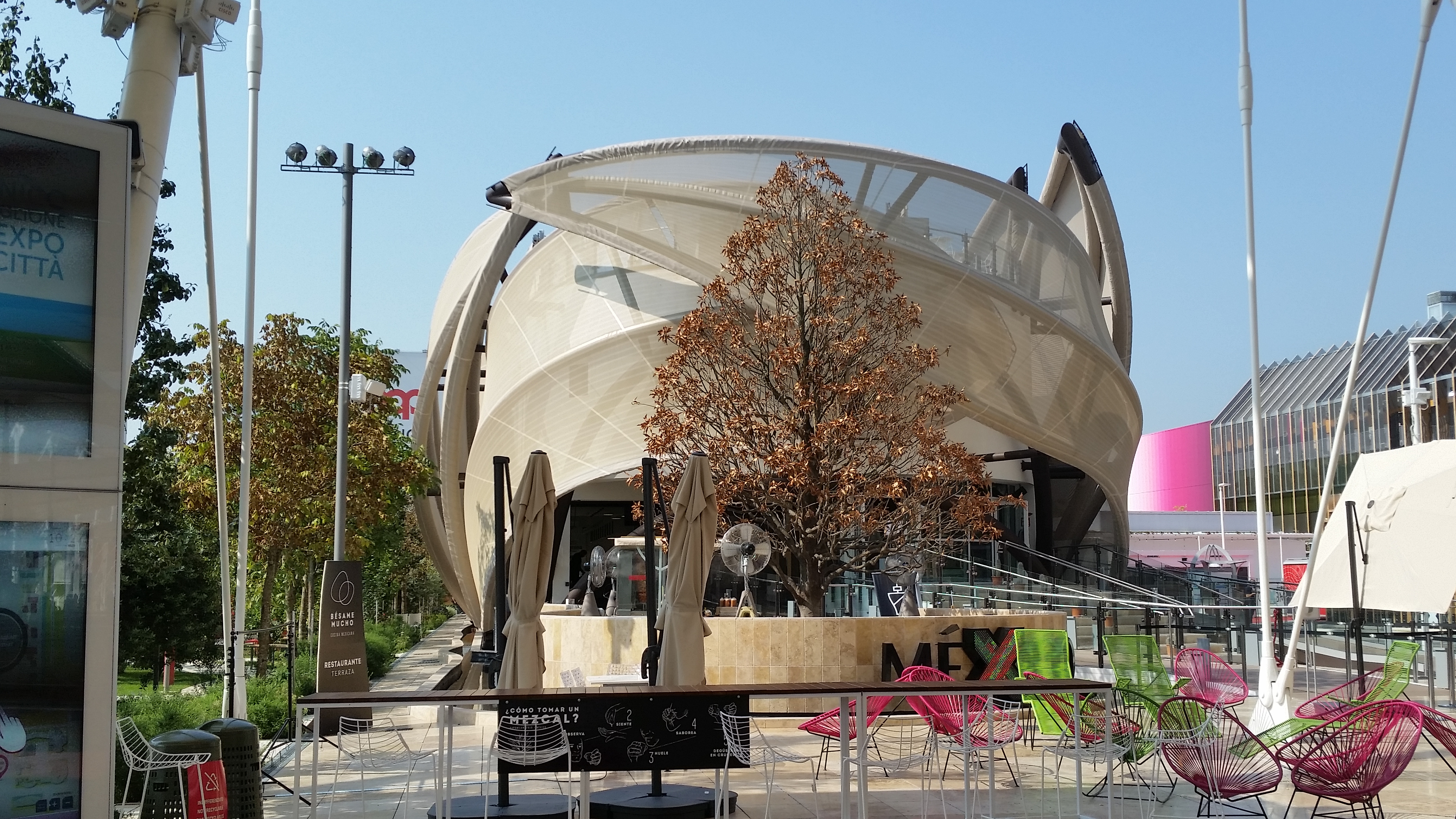
Mexico

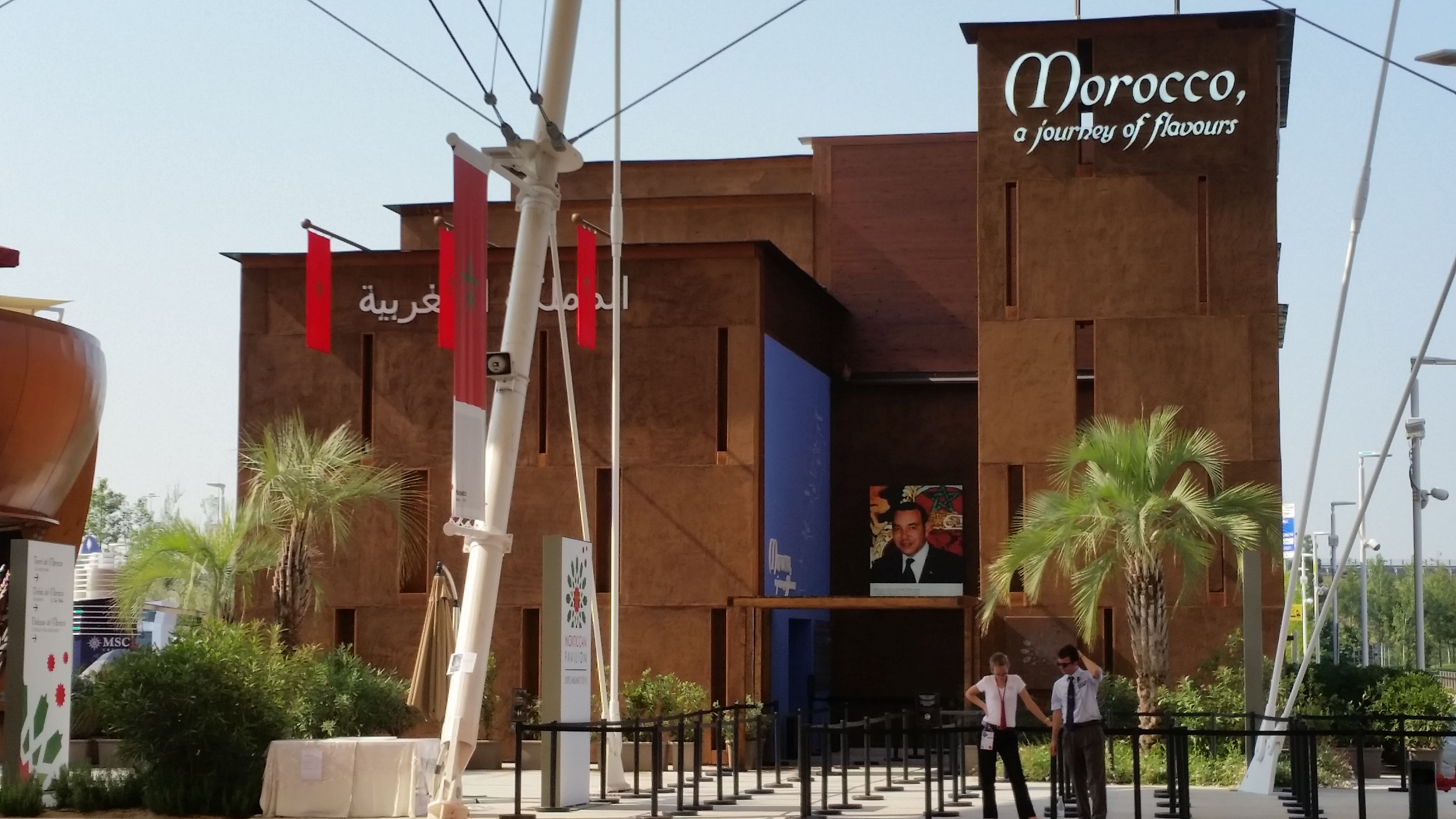
Morocco

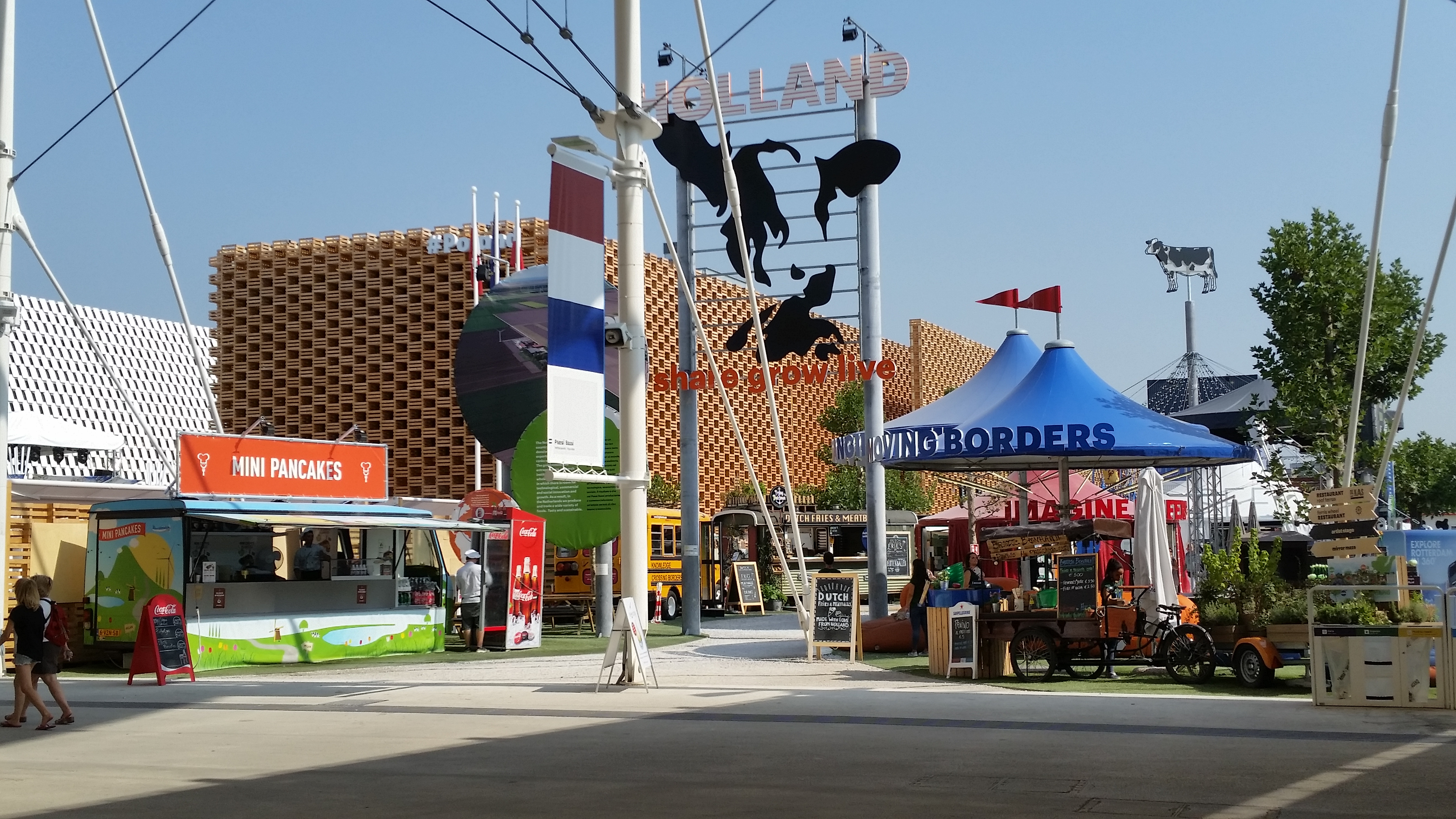
Netherlands

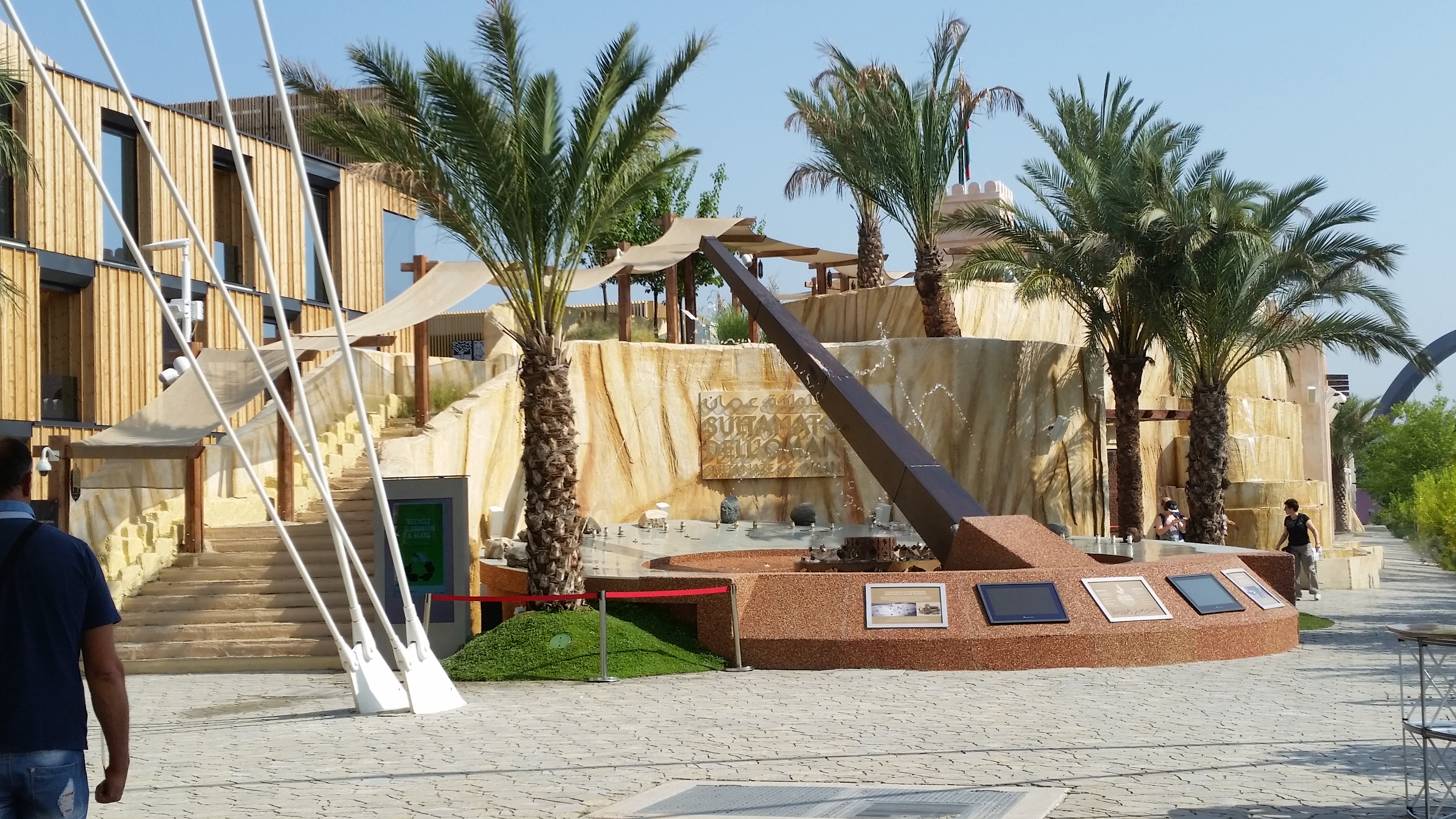
Oman

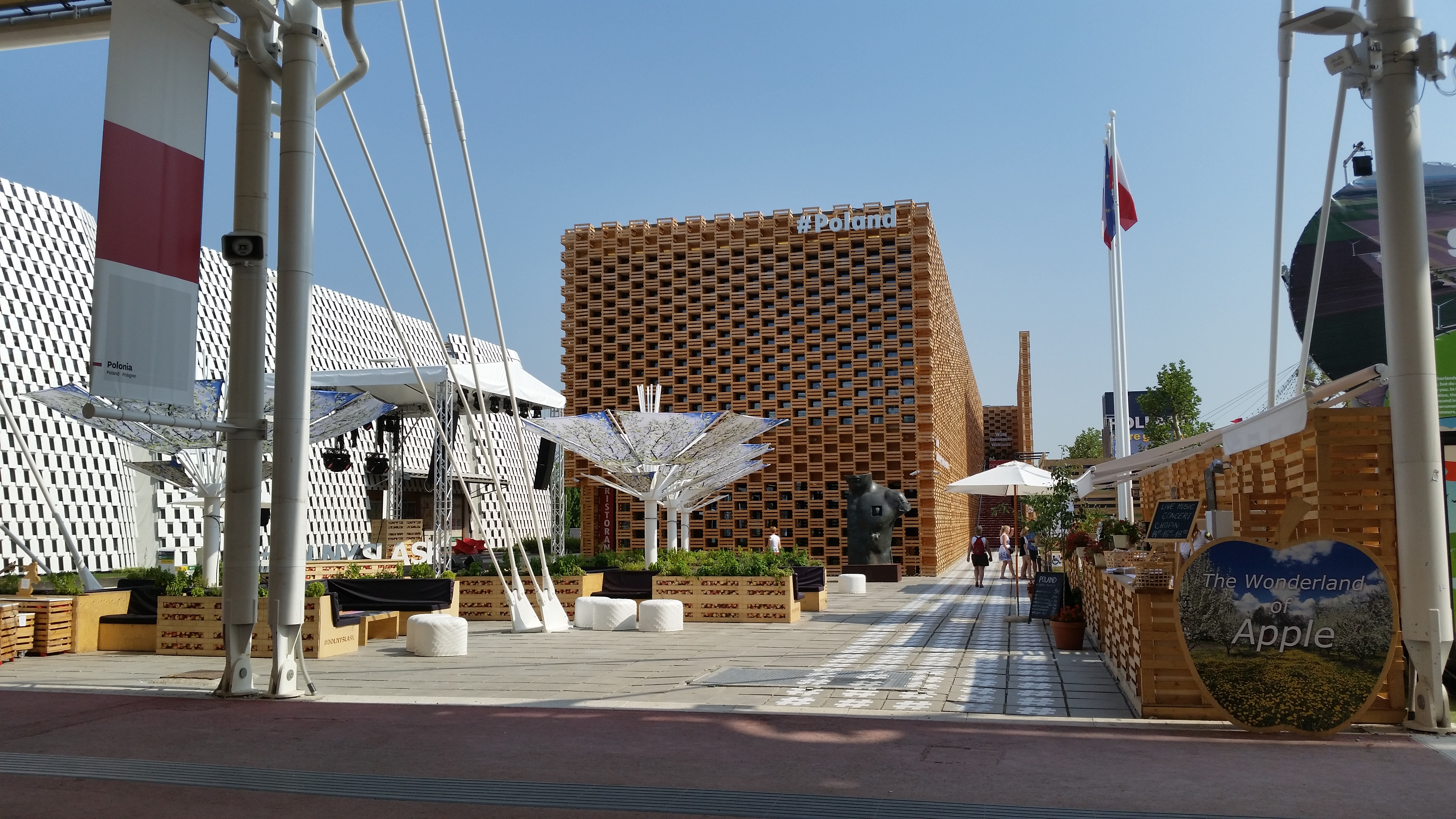
Poland

Romania

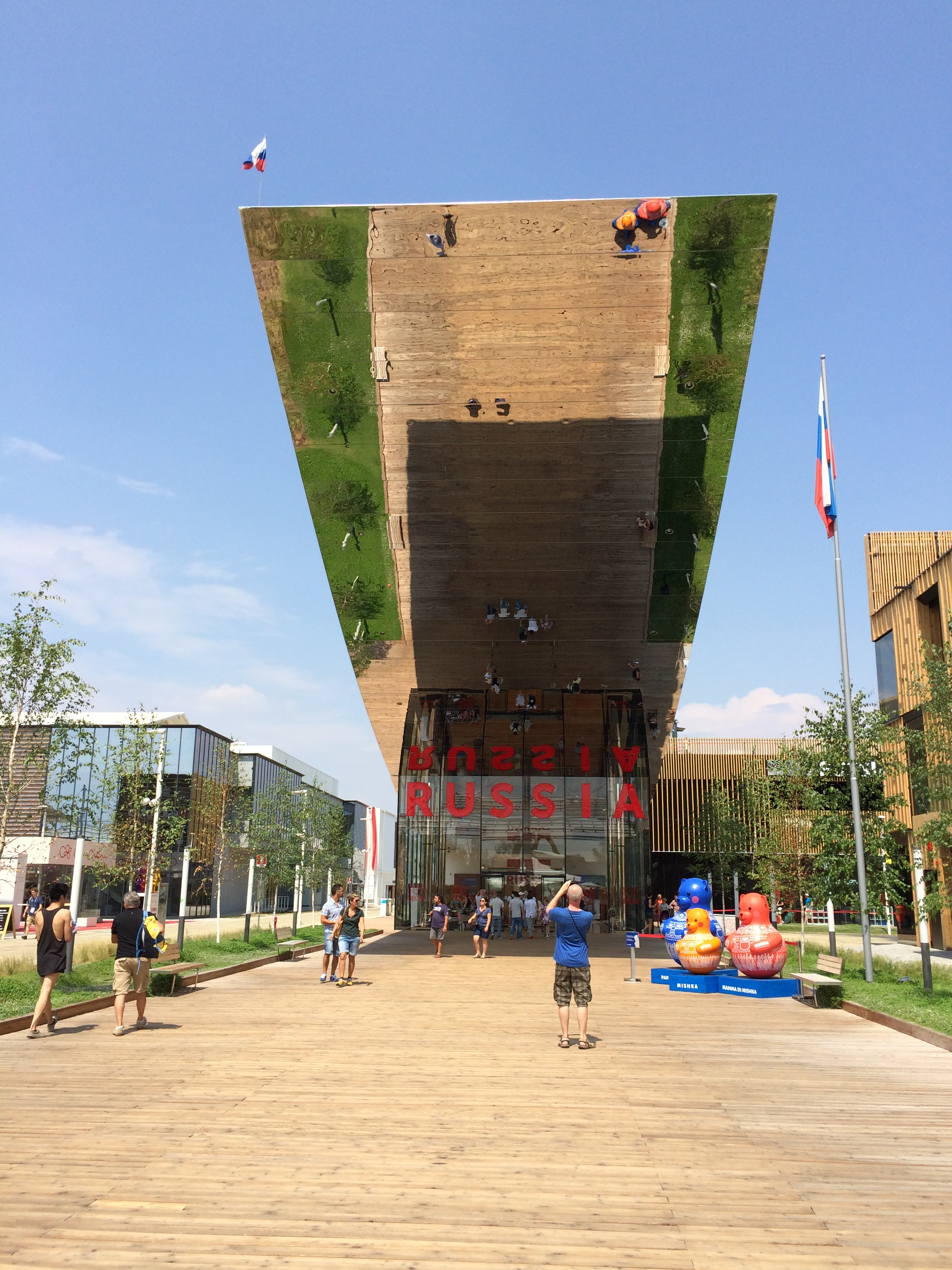
Russia

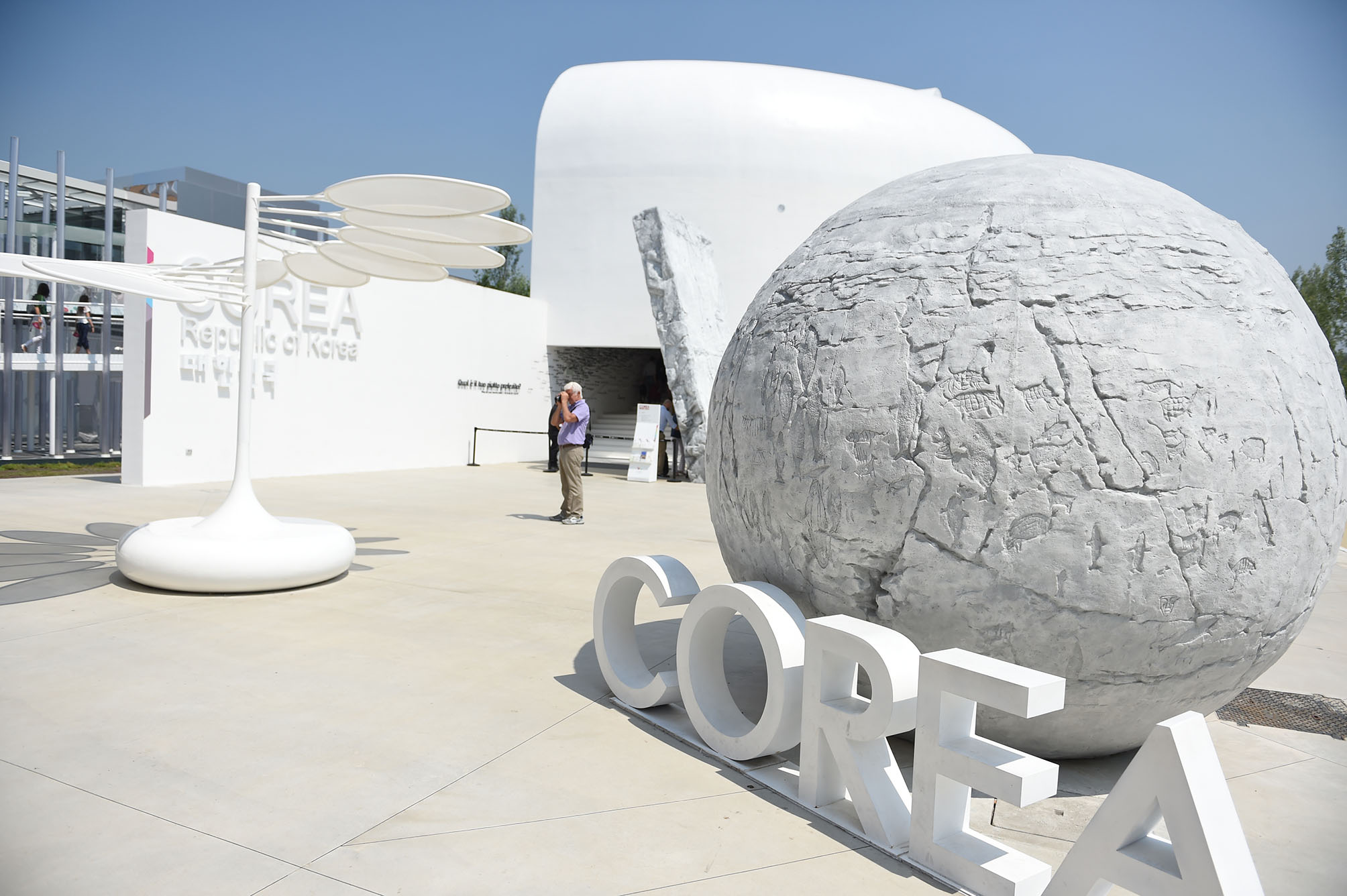
South Korea

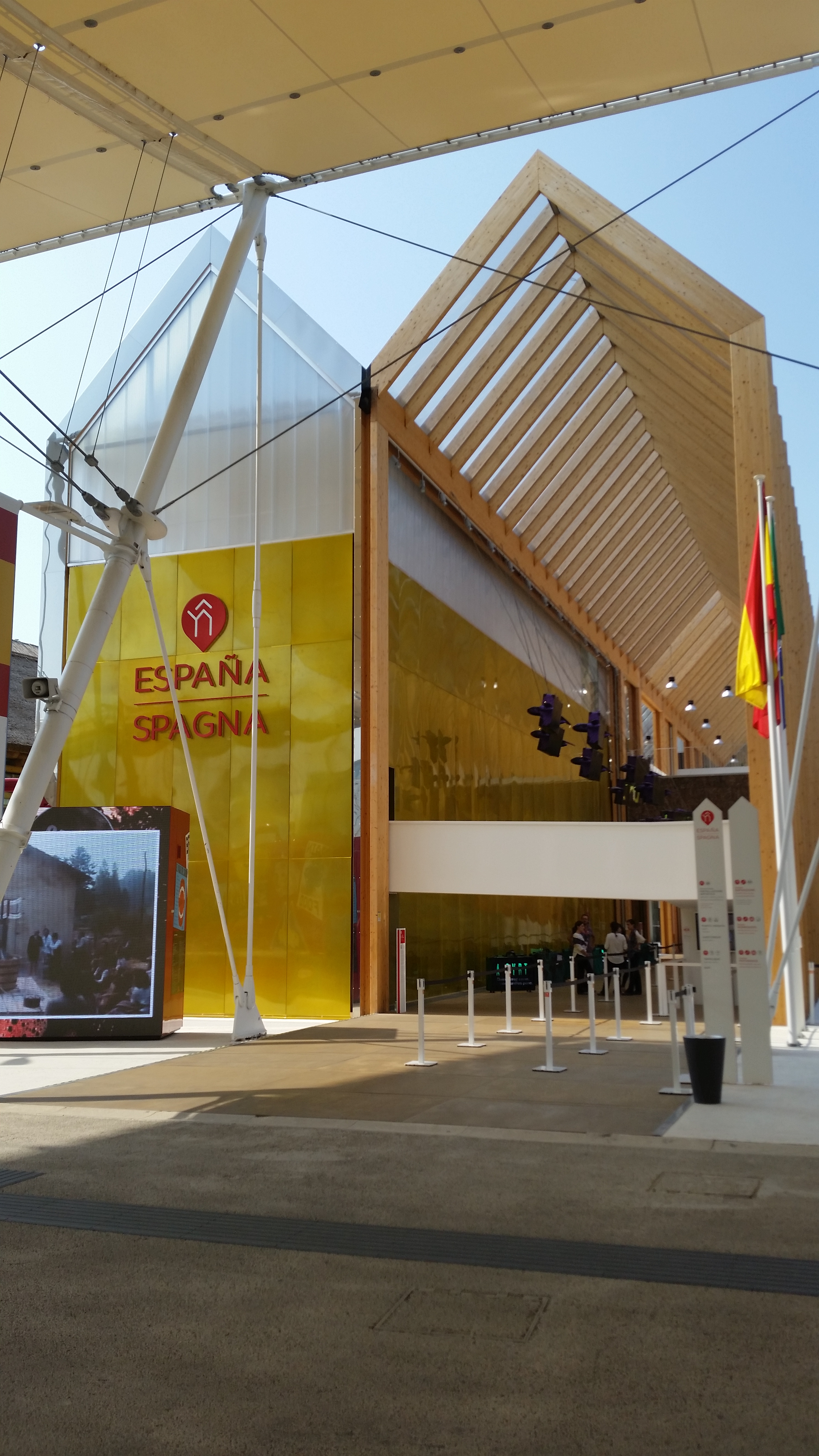
Spain

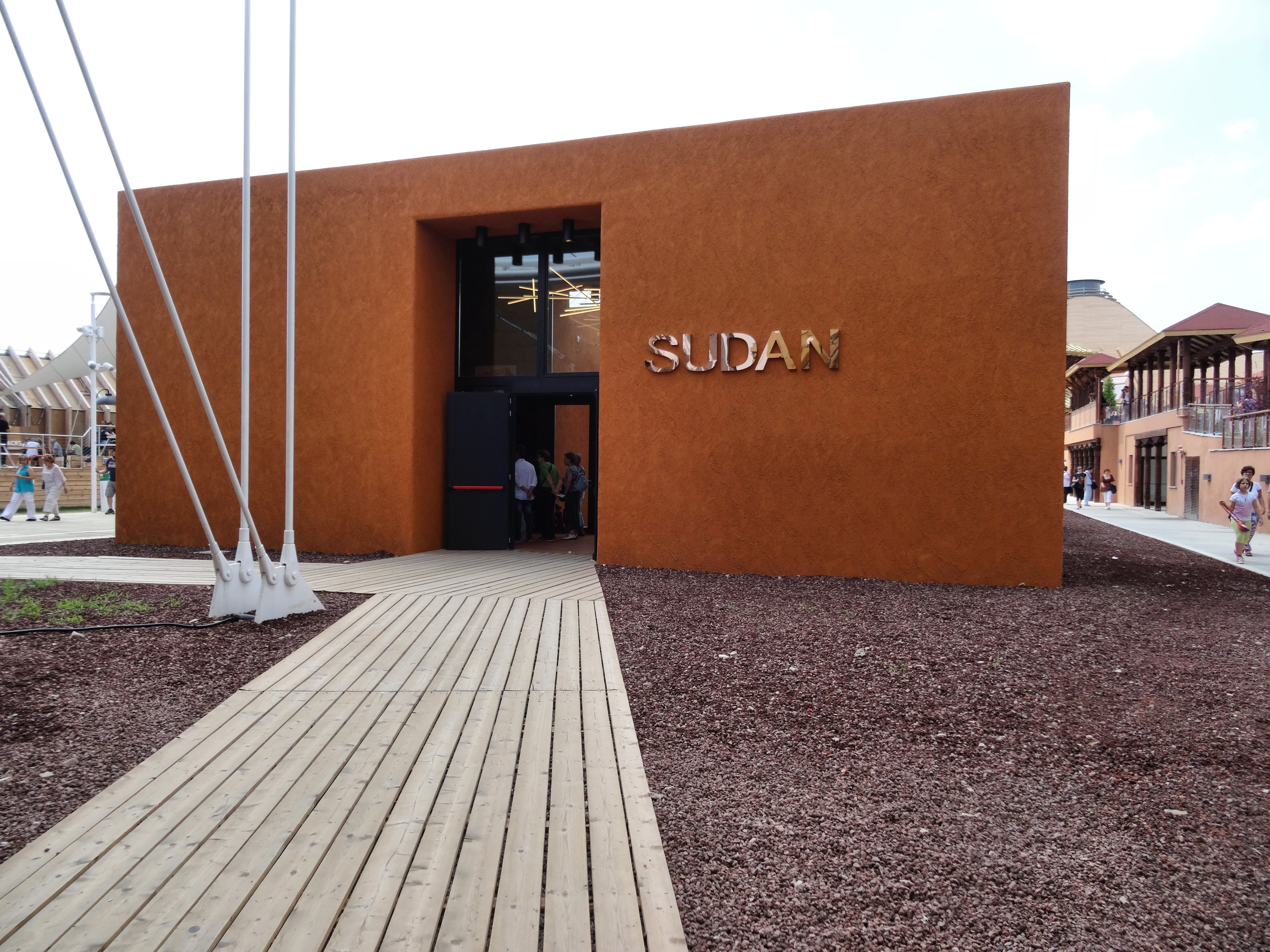
Sudan

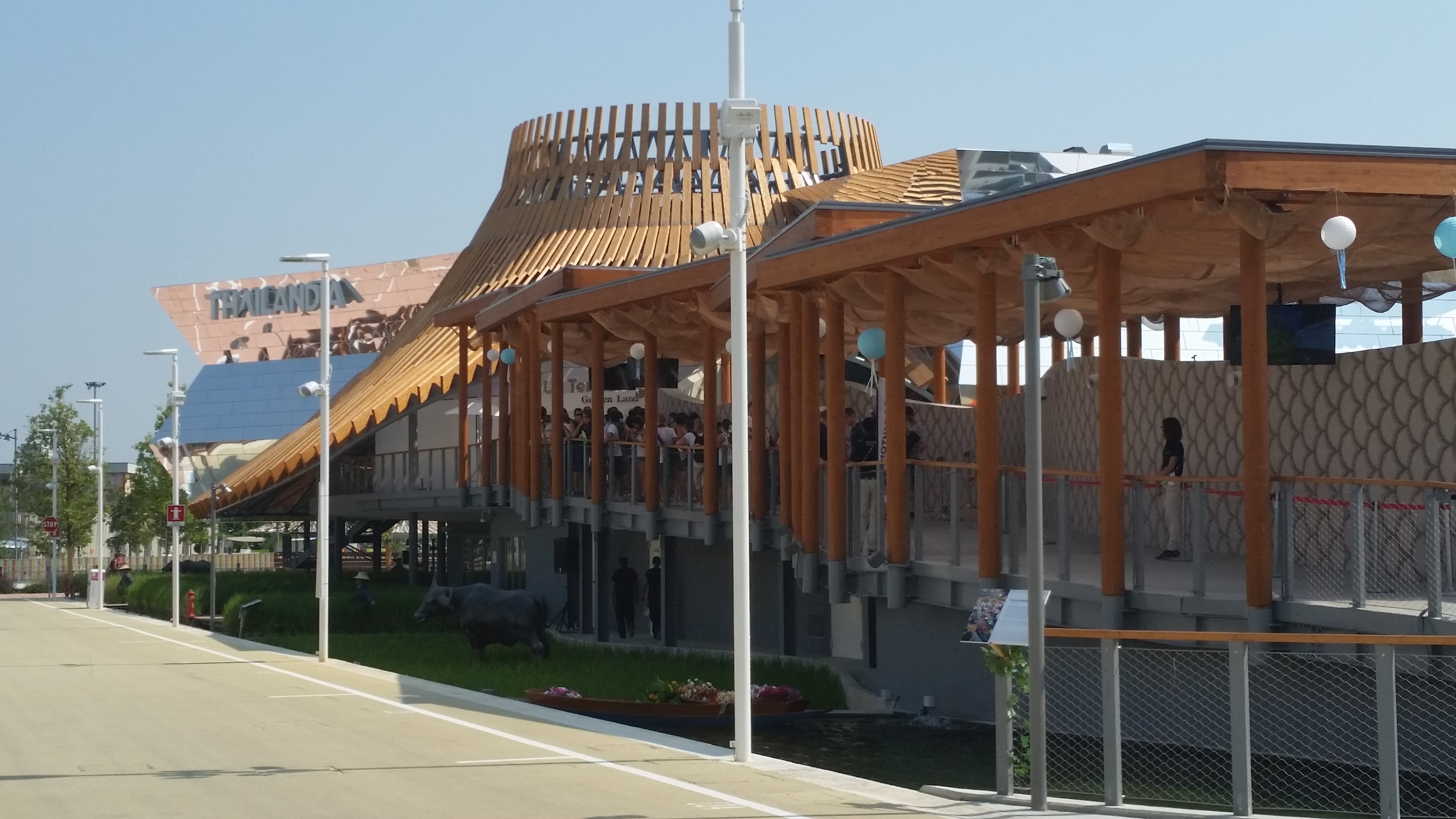
Thailand

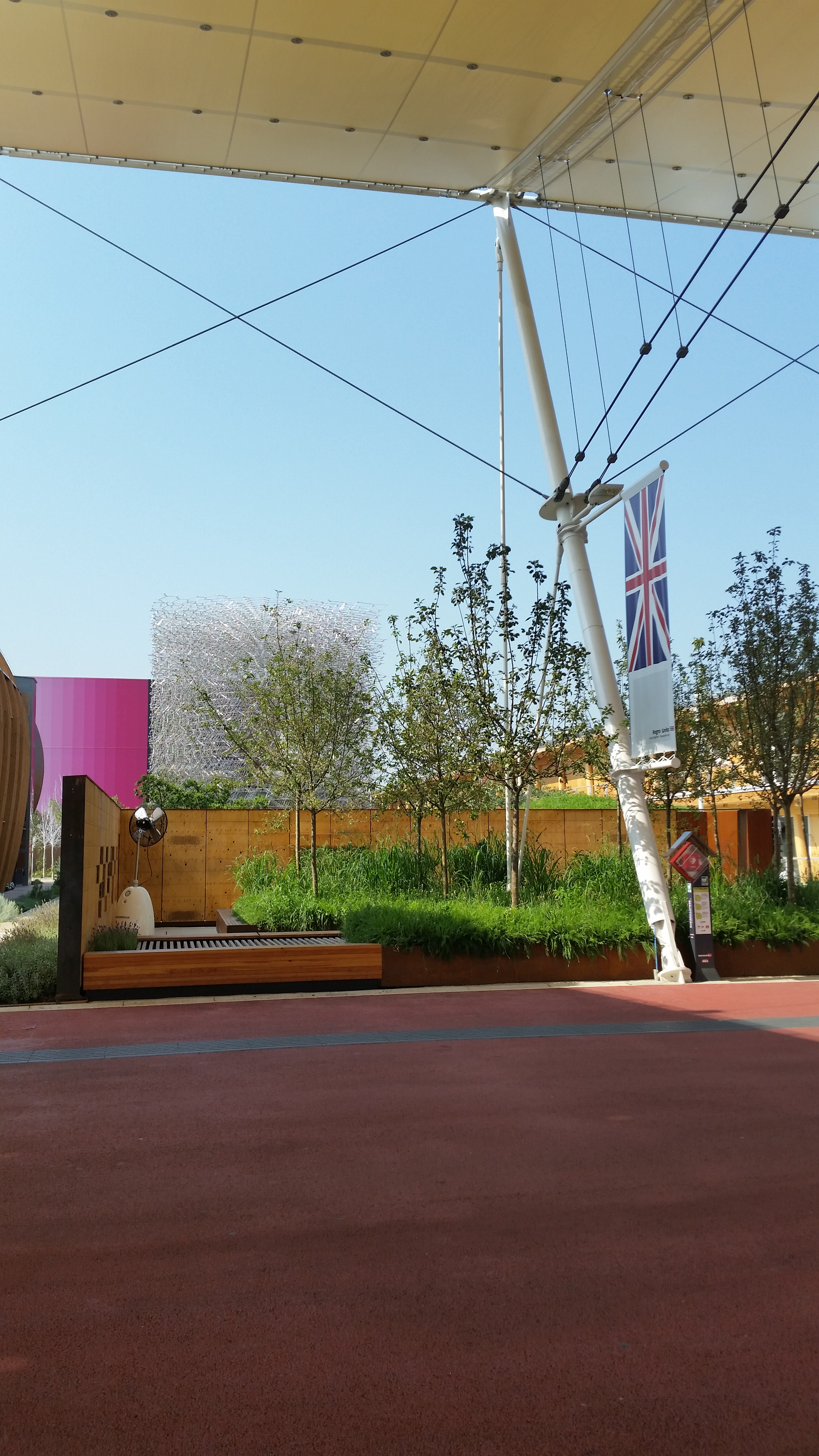
United Kingdom

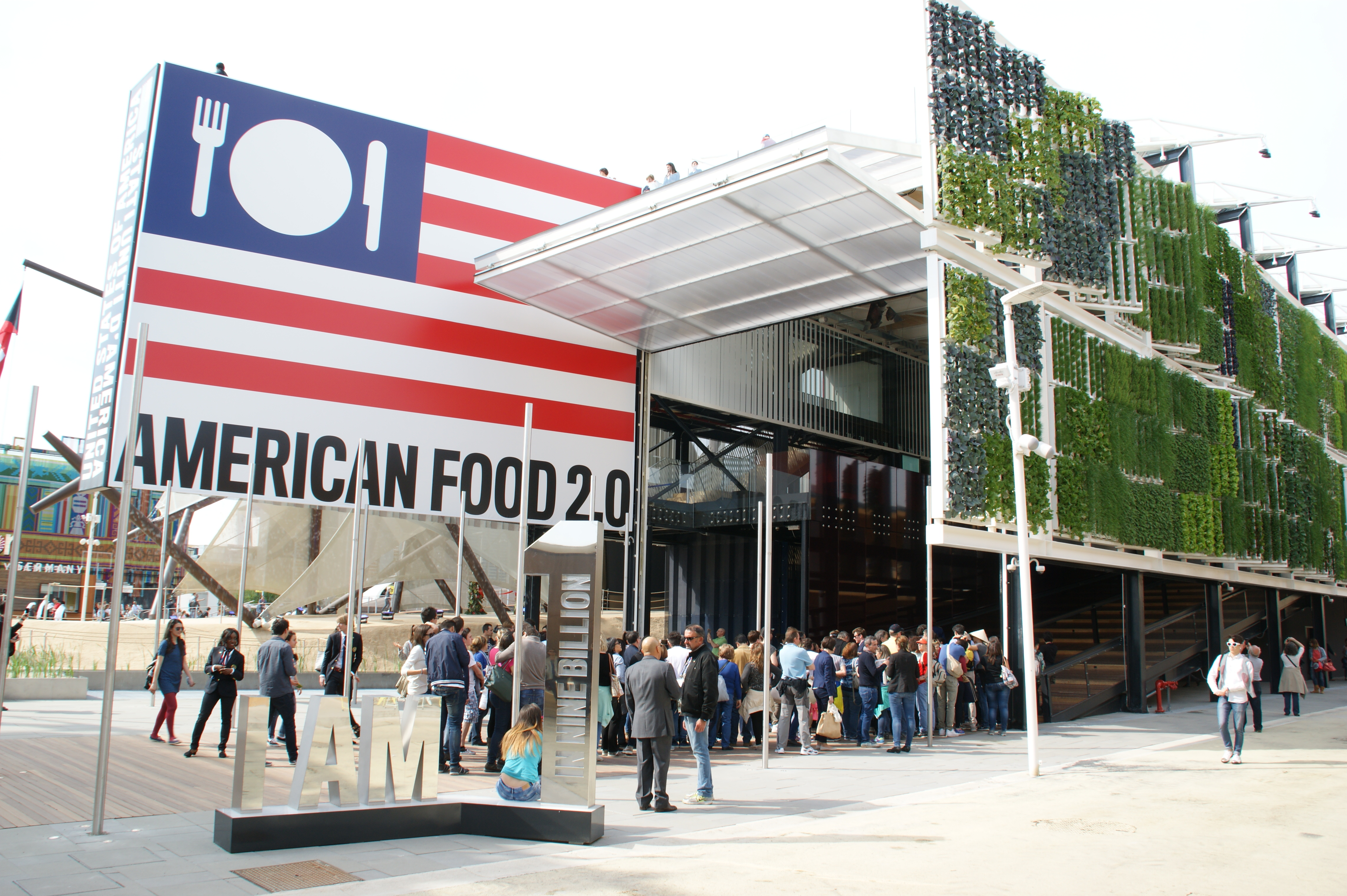
United States

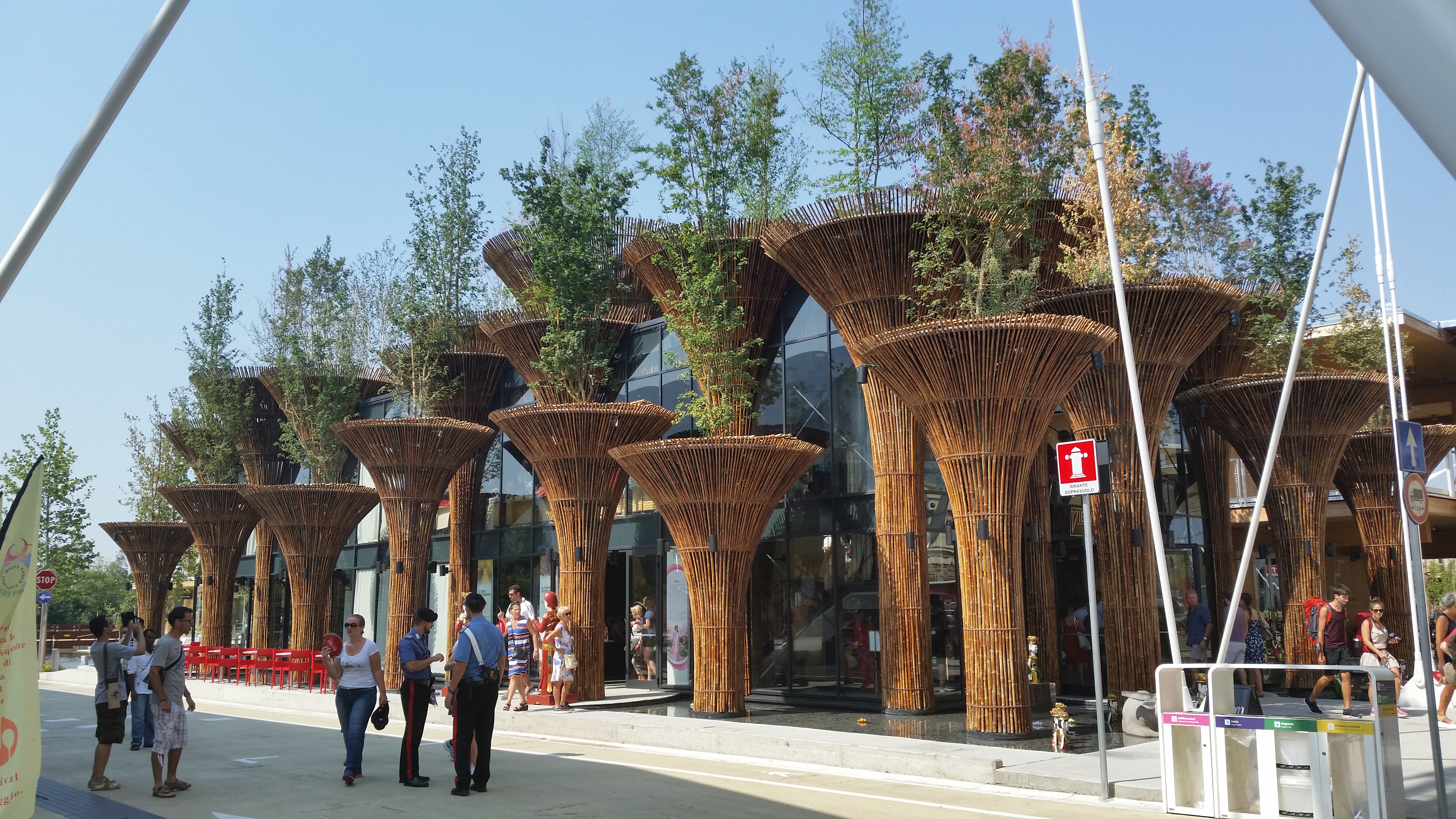
Vietnam

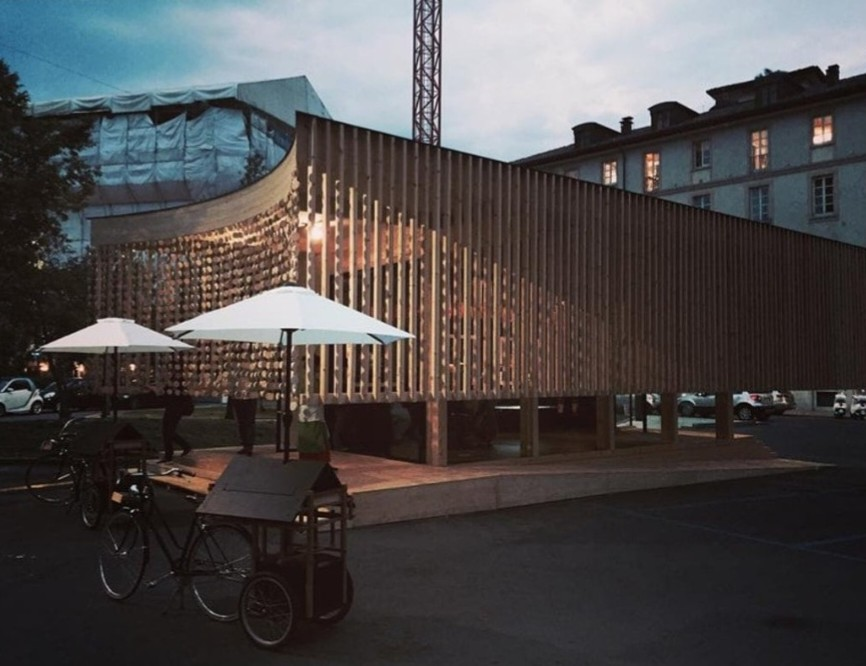
Taiwan

== See also ==
- Jellyfish Barge
- Nemo's Garden
