= 2023 Emmy Awards =

2023 Emmy Awards may refer to:

- 44th Sports Emmy Awards, held on May 22, 2023, honoring sports programming.
- 44th News and Documentary Emmy Awards, held on September 27–28, 2023, honoring news and documentary programming.
- 51st International Emmy Awards, held on November 20, 2023, honoring international programming.
- 50th Daytime Emmy Awards, honoring daytime programming, was moved from June to December 10, 2023, due to Hollywood labor strikes.
  - 50th Daytime Creative Arts & Lifestyle Emmy Awards, the separate Daytime Emmys ceremony to honor artistic and technical achievements in daytime programming, was moved from June to December 16, 2023, due to Hollywood labor strikes.
- 2nd Children's and Family Emmy Awards, held on December 16–17, 2023, honoring children's and family-oriented television programming.

2023 Emmy Awards may also refer to the following ceremonies that were postponed to 2024 due to Hollywood labor strikes:

- 75th Primetime Emmy Awards, honoring primetime programming, was moved from September 2023 to January 15, 2024.
- 75th Primetime Creative Arts Emmy Awards, the separate Primetime Emmys ceremony to honor artistic and technical achievements in primetime programming, was also pushed to January 2024.

Preceded by 2022	Emmy Awards; 2023	Succeeded by 2024
