= 2016 Emmy Awards =

2016 Emmy Awards may refer to:

- 68th Primetime Emmy Awards, the 2016 Emmy Awards ceremony that honored primetime programming during June 2015 – May 2016
- 43rd Daytime Emmy Awards, the 2016 Emmy Awards ceremony that honored daytime programming during 2015
- 44th International Emmy Awards, the 2016 ceremony that honored international programming

Preceded by 2015	Emmy Awards; 2016	Succeeded by 2017
