= 2017 Emmy Awards =

2017 Emmy Awards may refer to:

- 69th Primetime Emmy Awards, the 2017 Emmy Awards ceremony honoring primetime programming during June 2016 – May 2017
- 44th Daytime Emmy Awards, the 2017 Emmy Awards ceremony honoring daytime programming during 2016
- 45th International Emmy Awards, the 2017 ceremony honoring international programming

| Preceded by 2016 | Emmy Awards; 2017 | Succeeded by 2018 |
