= ATB discography =

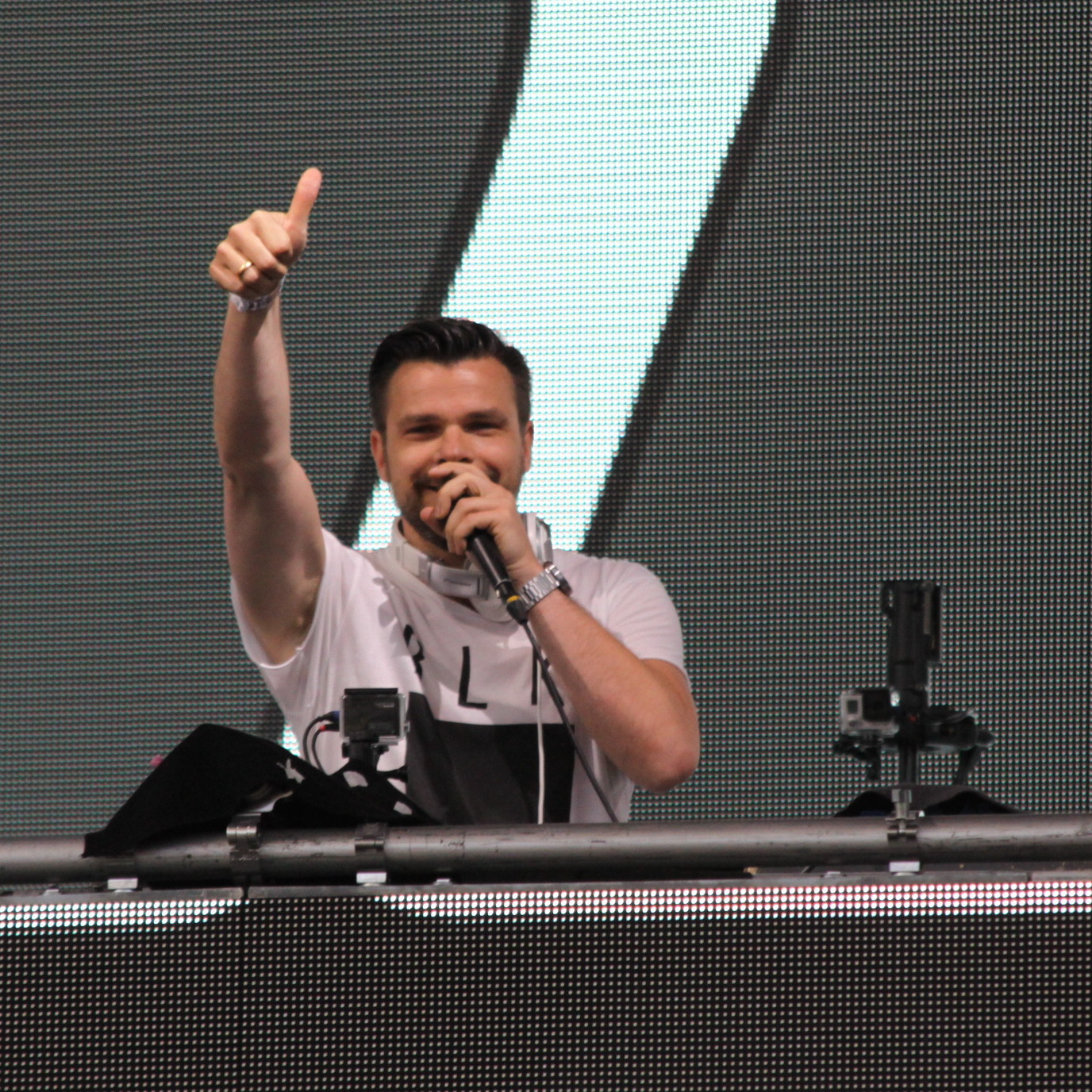
- ATB in 2015
- Studio albums: 10
- Extended plays: 2
- Compilation albums: 11
- Singles: 35
- Video albums: 6
- Music videos: 28

The discography of the German electronic musician ATB consists of 10 studio albums, 11 compilation album, 2 EPs, 36 singles, six video albums and 28 music videos. While ATB is mostly known in the world for his hit singles "9PM (Till I Come)" and "Don't Stop!", both of which were released from his first 1999 studio album Movin' Melodies, he still remains quite popular both at home and Eastern Europe including Poland where his studio albums Trilogy and Future Memories have gone Platinum.

== Albums ==
=== Studio albums ===
Title	Album details	Peak chart positions										Certifications
Title	Album details	GER	AUT	FIN	HUN	NLD	NOR	POL	SWE	SWI	UK	Certifications
Movin' Melodies	Released: April 26, 1999; Label: Kontor Records (Universal); Formats: CD, Cassette, LP	38	—	11	7	40	14	—	11	—	32	BPI: Silver
Two Worlds	Released: November 6, 2000; Label: Kontor Records (Universal); Formats: CD, Cassette, LP	45	—	—	—	—	—	—	—	—	—	
Dedicated	Released: January 28, 2002; Label: Kontor Records (Edel); Formats: CD, Cassette	10	63	22	8	—	—	—	—	—	—	MAHASZ: Gold
Addicted to Music	Released: April 28, 2003; Label: Kontor Records (Edel); Formats: CD, Cassette	8	—	—	19	—	—	25	—	—	—	
No Silence	Released: May 24, 2004; Label: Kontor Records (Edel); Formats: CD, Cassette	11	—	—	8	—	—	9	—	—	—	
Trilogy	Released: April 27, 2007; Label: Kontor Records (Edel); Formats: CD, digital download	18	—	—	—	—	—	6	—	—	—	ZPAV: Platinum
Future Memories	Released: May 1, 2009; Label: Kontor Records (Edel); Formats: CD, digital download	12	—	—	28	—	—	6	—	—	—	ZPAV: Platinum
Distant Earth	Released: April 29, 2011; Label: Kontor Records (Edel); Formats: CD, digital download	7	37	—	—	—	—	9	—	60	—	ZPAV: Platinum
Contact	Released: January 24, 2014; Label: Kontor Records (Edel); Formats: CD, digital download	5	29	—	11	44	—	2	—	44	—	ZPAV: Gold
neXt	Released: April 21, 2017; Label: Kontor Records (Edel); Formats: CD, digital download	14	42	—	—	—	—	14	—	55	—	
"—" denotes items which were not released in that country or failed to chart.

=== Compilation albums ===
Title	Album details	Peak chart positions			
Title	Album details	GER	AUT	HUN	POL
Seven Years: 1998–2005	Released: June 13, 2005; Label: Kontor Records (Edel); Formats: CD, digital download	15	72	21	3
Under the Stars	Released: January 2016; Label: Planetarium Bochum (PB-749); Format: CD	—	—	—	—
Under The Stars 2020	Released: January 17, 2020; Label: Ruhrtone Records; Format: CD	—	—	—	—

=== The DJ in the Mix ===
Title	Album details	Peak chart positions			Certifications
Title	Album details	AUT	HUN	POL	Certifications
The DJ in the Mix	Released: November 10, 2003; Label: Kontor Records (Edel); Formats: CD, Cassette	—	—	—	
The DJ 2 in the Mix	Released: November 15, 2004; Label: Kontor Records (Edel); Formats: CD, Cassette	—	—	—	
The DJ 3 in the Mix	Released: February 17, 2006; Label: Kontor Records (Edel); Formats: CD, Digital Download	—	12	8	
The DJ 4 in the Mix	Released: December 28, 2007; Label: Kontor Records (Edel); Formats: CD, Digital Download	—	23	19	
The DJ 5 in the Mix	Released: January 1, 2010; Label: Kontor Records (Edel); Formats: CD, Digital Download	—	7	17	ZPAV: Gold
The DJ 6 in the Mix	Released: December 31, 2010; Label: Kontor Records (Edel); Formats: CD, Digital Download	66	—	34	ZPAV: Gold
"—" denotes items which were not released in that country or failed to chart.

=== Sunset Beach DJ Sessions ===
Title	Album details	Peak chart positions		Certifications
Title	Album details	HUN	POL	Certifications
Sunset Beach DJ Session	Released: July 2, 2010; Label: Kontor Records (Edel); Formats: CD, Digital download	4	7	ZPAV: Gold
Sunset Beach DJ Session 2	Released: June 8, 2012; Label: Kontor Records (Edel); Formats: CD, Digital download	—	13	ZPAV: Gold
"—" denotes items which were not released in that country or failed to chart.

== Extended plays ==
List of extended plays
Title	Details
A New Life	Released: November 8, 2019; Label: Ruhrtune Records; Formats: Digital download
The DJ EP (Vol. 01)	Released: October 22, 2021; Label: Virgin Records; Formats: Digital download

== Singles ==
Title	Year	Peak chart positions										Certifications	Album
Title	Year	GER	AUS	AUT	FIN	HUN	NLD	NOR	SWE	SWI	UK	Certifications	Album
"9 PM (Till I Come)" (featuring Yolanda Rivera)	1998	14	10	—	—	—	11	3	31	21	1	ARIA: Platinum; BPI: 2× Platinum; GLF: Platinum; IFPI NOR: Gold	Movin' Melodies
"Don't Stop!" (featuring Yolanda Rivera)	1999	13	11	—	8	—	17	8	20	49	3	ARIA: Gold; BPI: Silver; GLF: Platinum	Movin' Melodies
"Killer" (with Woody van Eyden and Drue Williams)	1999	31	33	—	16	—	22	—	24	—	4		Movin' Melodies
"The Summer"	2000	21	61	—	20	—	—	—	47	46	—		Two Worlds
"The Fields of Love" (featuring York)	2000	42	—	—	12	—	—	—	—	97	16		Two Worlds
"Let U Go" (featuring Roberta Harrison)	2001	7	—	15	19	—	—	—	—	84	34		Two Worlds
"Hold You" (featuring Roberta Harrison)	2001	18	—	39	14	5	—	—	—	86	—		Dedicated
"You're Not Alone" (featuring Roberta Harrison)	2002	13	—	17	—	9	—	—	—	80	—		Dedicated
"I Don't Wanna Stop" (featuring Roberta Harrison)	2003	17	—	53	20	4	—	—	—	—	—		Addicted to Music
"Long Way Home" (featuring Roberta Harrison)	2003	35	—	52	—	6	—	—	—	—	—		Addicted to Music
"In Love with the DJ / Sunset Girl"	2003	—	—	—	—	—	—	—	—	—	—		Addicted to Music
"Marrakech" (featuring Tiff Lacey)	2004	38	—	50	14	2	—	—	—	—	—		No Silence
"Ecstasy" (featuring Tiff Lacey)	2004	43	—	62	—	2	—	—	—	—	—		No Silence
"Here with Me" (featuring Tiff Lacey)	2004	—	—	—	—	—	—	—	—	—	—		No Silence
"Believe in Me" (featuring Jan Löchel)	2005	48	—	66	15	—	—	—	—	—	—		Seven Years: 1998–2005
"Humanity" (featuring Tiff Lacey)	2005	64	—	—	—	—	—	—	—	—	—		Seven Years: 1998–2005
"Let U Go (Reworked)" (featuring Jan Löchel)	2005	—	—	—	—	—	—	—	—	—	—		Seven Years: 1998–2005
"Summer Rain"	2006	—	—	—	—	—	—	—	—	—	—		The DJ 3 in the Mix
"Renegade" (featuring Heather Nova)	2007	38	—	73	3	3	—	—	—	—	—		Trilogy
"Feel Alive" (featuring Jan Löchel)	2007	73	—	—	—	—	—	—	—	—	—		Trilogy
"Justify" (featuring Jennifer Karr)	2007	—	—	—	—	—	—	—	—	—	—		Trilogy
"Wrong Medication" (featuring Jades)	2008	—	—	—	—	—	—	—	—	—	—		Non-album single
"What About Us/LA Nights" (featuring Jan Löchel)	2009	65	—	—	—	—	—	—	—	—	—		Future Memories
"Behind" (featuring Flanders)	2009	87	—	—	—	—	—	—	—	—	—		Future Memories
"9PM Reloaded"	2010	—	—	—	—	—	—	—	—	—	—		The DJ 5 in the Mix
"Could You Believe"	2010	—	—	—	—	—	—	—	—	—	—		Sunset Beach DJ Session
"Twisted Love" (featuring Christina Soto)	2011	—	—	—	—	—	—	—	—	—	—		The DJ 6 in the Mix
"Gold" (featuring Jansson)	2011	—	—	—	—	—	—	—	—	—	—		Distant Earth
"Apollo Road" (with Dash Berlin)	2011	—	—	—	—	—	—	—	—	—	—		Distant Earth
"Move On" (featuring JanSoon)	2011	—	—	—	—	—	—	—	—	—	—		Distant Earth
"Never Give Up" (featuring Ramona Nerra)	2012	—	—	—	—	—	—	—	—	—	—		Sunset Beach DJ Session 2
"Face to Face" (featuring Stanfour)	2014	—	—	—	—	—	—	—	—	—	—		Contact
"When It Ends It Starts Again" (featuring Sean Ryan)	2014	—	—	—	—	—	—	—	—	—	—		Contact
"Raging Bull" (with Boss and Swan)	2014	—	—	—	—	—	—	—	—	—	—		Contact
"Flash X"	2015	—	—	—	—	—	—	—	—	—	—		neXt
"Connected" (featuring Andrew Rayel)	2017	—	—	—	—	—	—	—	—	—	—		neXt
"Message Out to You" (with F51 featuring Robbin & Jonnis)	2017	—	—	—	—	—	—	—	—	—	—		neXt
"Pages" (featuring Haliene)	2017	—	—	—	—	—	—	—	—	—	—		neXt
"Body 2 Body" (featuring Conor Matthews and Laur)	2018	—	—	—	—	—	—	—	—	—	—		Non-album singles
"Heartbeat" (with Markus Schulz)	2019	—	—	—	—	—	—	—	—	—	—		Non-album singles
"Your Love (9PM)" (with Topic and A7S)	2021	6	18	8	14	2	7	18	59	6	8	ARIA: Platinum; BPI: Platinum	TBA
"Simply Mad" (as Eanoh)	2021	—	—	—	—	—	—	—	—	—	—		TBA
"Like That" (featuring Ben Samama)	2021	—	—	—	—	—	—	—	—	—	—		TBA
"That Feeling" (featuring TRAVYP)	2023	—	—	—	—	—	—	—	—	—	—		TBA
"Take a Moment" (featuring David Frank)	2023	—	—	—	—	—	—	—	—	—	—		TBA
"—" denotes releases that did not chart or were not released.

== Videography ==
=== Home videos ===
- 2003: Addicted to Music
- 2004: No Silence (included with No Silence – Special Edition)
- 2005: Seven Years (1998–2005)
- 2006: Live in Poznań
- 2007: Trilogy (included with the Trilogy – The Platinum Edition)
- 2009: Future Memories (included in Future Memories – Limited Edition)

=== Music videos ===
(from Movin' Melodies)

- 1998: 9pm (Till I Come) (feat. Yolanda Rivera)
- 1999: Don't Stop! (feat. Yolanda Rivera)
- 1999: Killer (with Woody van Eyden & Drue Williams)

(from Two Worlds)

- 2000: The Summer
- 2000: The Fields of Love (feat. York)
- 2001: Let U Go (feat. Roberta Harrison)

(from "Dedicated")

- 2001: Hold You (feat. Roberta Harrison)
- 2002: You're Not Alone (feat. Roberta Harrison)

(from Addicted to Music)

- 2003: I Don't Wanna Stop (feat. Roberta Harrison)
- 2003: Long Way Home (feat. Roberta Harrison)
- 2004: I Don't Wanna Stop (Original Edit) (feat. Roberta Harrison)

(from No Silence)

- 2004: Marrakech (feat. Tiff Lacey)
- 2004: Ecstasy (feat. Tiff Lacey)

(from Seven Years: 1998–2005)

- 2005: Believe in Me (also as "A&T Remix" and "Rockamerica Remix") (feat. Jan Löchel)
- 2005: Humanity (feat. Tiff Lacey)
- 2005: Let U Go (Reworked) (feat. Jan Löchel)

(from Trilogy)

- 2007: Renegade (also as "A&T Remix Edit") (feat. Heather Nova)
- 2007: Feel Alive (feat. Jan Löchel)

(from Future Memories)

- 2009: What About Us (feat. Jan Löchel)
- 2009: L.A. Nights
- 2009: Behind (feat. Flanders)

(from The DJ 5 in the Mix)

- 2010: 9 PM Reloaded

(from Sunset Beach DJ Session)

- 2010: Could You Believe

(from Distant Earth)

- 2011: Gold (feat. Jansoon)
- 2011: Apollo Road (feat. Dash Berlin)
- 2011: Move On (feat. Jansoon)

(from The DJ 6 in the Mix)

- 2011: Twisted Love (feat. Cristina Soto)

(from Sunset Beach DJ Session 2)

- 2012: Never Give Up (feat. Ramona Nerra)
- 2012: In and Out of Love (with Rudee & Ramona Nerra)

(from Contact)

- 2014: Face to Face (feat. Stanfour)
- 2014: When It Ends It Starts Again (feat. Sean Ryan)
- 2014: Raging Bull (with Boss & Swan)

(others)

- 2018: Body 2 Body (feat. Conor Matthews & LAUR)
- 2021: Your Love (9PM) (with Topic and A7S)

== Other work and productions ==
=== Singles ===
Sequential One (with Ulrich Pöppelbaum)

- 1994: "Back 2 Unity"
- 1995: "Happy Feelings"
- 1996: "Pump Up The Bass"
- 1996: "My Love Is Hot" (feat. Morpha)
- 1997: "I Wanna Make U..."/"Get Down" (feat. Morpha)
- 1997: "Dreams" (feat. Morpha)
- 1998: "Imagination" (feat. Morpha & Barry Mullen-Pascher)
- 1998: "Inspiration Vibes"
- 1999: "Angels"/"Moments In Atmosphere"

Inferno DJs (with Woody van Eyden, Kosmonova, Kevin C. Cox & Bass Bumpers)

- 1998 "Tower Inferno"
- 1999 "Why Don't You"

Love & Fate (with Woody van Eyden)

- 1996: "Love And Fate"
- 1997: "Deeper Love"
- 1998: "Love And Fate Part II"

Re-Flex (with Woody van Eyden, Ulrich Pöppelbaum, Tom Mountain, Spyker Mike & MPT)

- 2000: "Lui"
- 2000: "Ubap"
- 2001: "Babadeng"
- 2002: "Headbangers Go"
- 2004: "Abdulle"
- 2007: "Lui 2007"

U.K.W. (with Woody van Eyden, Ulrich Pöppelbaum & Ray Corn)

- 1999: "Hypnotic"
- 2000 "Electric Love"

Other aliases

- 1993: "Deep In Your Soul" (with Thomas Kukula as Space Corp 1)
- 1993: "Trance Music Was Born" (with Thomas Kukula as All In Vain)
- 1995: "Na Na Na" (with Stefan Heinemann as Beatmen)
- 1995: "Move On Groove One" (with Woody van Eyden as Ironic Beat)
- 1998: "Guitano"/"Beach Vibes" (with Woody van Eyden as E.F.F.)
- 2001: "Tanztablette" (with Alex M.O.R.P.H. as Unit 2)
- 2004: "Union" (with Kai Tracid as Farrago)

Productions or co-productions for other artists

- 1995: DJ Jacques O. feat. Jennifer Boyce – "Kiss Me"
- 1996: Bob Doope – "A Wonderful Time (Up There)"
- 1996: Joan Robinson – "Work It Out"
- 1998: Woody van Eyden – "Freaky Wings"
- 1998: Woody van Eyden – "Fiesta in Mallorca"
- 1998: Woody van Eyden – "Time Now"
- 1999: Woody van Eyden – "Get Ready"
- 2000: Woody van Eyden – "Feels Like Flyin'"

=== Promotional singles ===
Sequential One (with Ulrich Pöppelbaum, additionally co-produced by Thomas Kukula (1993) and Woody van Eyden (1996–1998))

- 1993: "Let Me Hear You"
- 1993: "Dance"/"Raving"
- 1994: "Here We Go Again"
- 1995: "Never Start To Stop"

SQ-1

- 1999: "Can You Feel..."
- 1999: "Music So Wonderful"
- 2000: "One, Two, Three"
- 2001: "Dance (2001 Version)"
- 2002: "Balare" (with Roberto Mirto & RuDee)

Danny Lee

- 1996: "(Here Comes) The Music"

Naughty A.T.

- 1996: "Suck Me"

== Remixes ==
1993: Damage Control – "You've Got to Believe"; 1993: General Base – "Base of Love"; 1993: General Base – "I See You"; 1993: General Base – "Apache"; 1994: Brain – "I Don't Care"; 1994: Fun Factory – "I Wanna B With U"; 1994: Fun Factory – "Pain"; 1994: Zoo Ink. – "Lay Down"; 1994: Black Baron – "What's Your Name"; 1994: Chyp Notic feat. Greg Ellis – "Don't Break The Heart"; 1994: Com Eta – "Far Away"; 1994: Cymurai feat. Thea Austin – "Magic Touch"; 1994: Pia – "Give a Little Love"; 1994: DJ Jaques O. – "Rave Can Can"; 1995: Azuka feat. D.J. Honfo – "Africa is Calling"; 1995: DJ Bossi – "Embassy of Love"; 1995: Heintje – "Mama '95"; 1995: General Base – "Thank U"; 1995: Interactive – "Tell Me When"; 1995: Shee – "Do You Love Me"; 1995: T.H.K – "So Big"; 1995: Two Little Butterflies – "Monja/Gimme Just A Moment"; 1995: U 96 – "Movin'"; 1996: Cymurai feat. Thea Austin – "Let Go"; 1996: Fish & Chips – "Rhythm of Rain"; 1996: Future Breeze – "Why Don't You Dance With Me"; 1996: Hamilton Bohannon – "The Stomp!"; 1996: Justine Earp – "Ooo-la-la-la"; 1996: Marcel Romanoff – "Show Me the Way to Your Heart"; 1996: Megaherz – "Liebeslied"; 1996: Red 5 – "Da Beat Goes"; 1996: Technotronic – "Pump Up the Jam"; 1996: The Monitors – "Tears of a clown"; 1996: The Cool Notes – "Spend the Night '96"; 1996: Outhere Brothers – "Olé Olé"; 1996: Zhi-Vago – "Celebrate (The Love)"; 1997: 666 – "Alarma"; 1997: Bass Bumpers – "(Keep Me) Runnin'"; 1997: Bossi – "Funky Technician"; 1997: C-Mania – "Cross My Mind"; 1997: C-Mania – "Dominating"; 1997: General Base – "On & On"; 1997: M.R. (Maggie Reilly) – "Listen to Your Heart"; 1997: Phantasma – "Welcome to the Club"; 1997: Real McCoy – "One More Time"; 1997: Thoka – "Te Quierro Ya"; 1998: Black & White Brothers – "Put Your Hands Up"	1998: Inferno DJs – "Tower Inferno"; 1998: Layella – "Free" (ATB Radio Edit); 1998: Mazza & Go – "Bitter Sweet Symphony"; 1998: United DJs For Central America – "Too Much Rain"; 1998: The Soundlovers – "Surrender"; 1999: Ayla – "Liebe"; 1999: Blank & Jones – "Cream"; 1999: Bob Marley vs. Funkstar Deluxe – "Sun Is Shining"; 1999: Candy Beat – "Saxy '99"; 1999: Kosmonova – "Acid Folk 2000"; 1999: Miss Jane – "It's a Fine Day"; 1999: Miss Peppermint – "Welcome to Tomorrow"; 1999: Moby – "Why Does My Heart Feel So Bad?"; 1999: Sash! – "Colour the World"; 1999: Vernon's World – "Wonderer"; 1999: William Orbit – "Barber's Adagio For Strings"; 2000: a-ha – "Minor Earth Major Sky"; 2000: Andru Donalds – "Precious Little Diamond"; 2000: Enigma – "Push the Limits"; 2000: Inferno DJs – "Why Don't You"; 2000: Rank 1 – "Airwave"; 2000: Spacekid – "Tune"; 2000: DJ Taucher – "Science Fiction"; 2000: Texas – "I Don't Want a Lover"; 2000: York – "Farewell to the Moon"; 2001: Gouryella – "Tenshi"; 2001: Nino Lopez Project – "Experience"; 2001: Ramirez – "El Gallinero"; 2001: Sarah Brightman – "A Whiter Shade of Pale"; 2001: Signum – "First Strike"; 2001: Tukan – "Light a Rainbow"; 2001: York – "Yesterday (Silence)"; 2002: Atlantic Ocean – "Waterfall 2002"; 2002: Kai Tracid – "4 Just 1 Day"; 2003: Chicane – "Daylight"; 2003: Schiller – "Liebe"; 2005: Dance United – "Help Asia!"; 2005: Narcotic Thrust – "When the Dawn Breaks"; 2005: Farolfi & Gambafreaks vs. Moloko – "A Style Suite"; 2006: Mr. Sam feat. Kirsty Hawkshaw – "Insight"; 2006: Herbert Grönemeyer – "Celebrate the Day" (Offizielle Fußball Weltcup 2006 Anthem); 2006: Above & Beyond – "Can't Sleep"; 2007: Mark Norman – "Ventura"; 2008: Jean Michel Jarre – "Vintage"; 2009: Nature One Inc. – "Wake Up in Yellow"; 2009: Everything But The Girl – "Missing"; 2010: Ich + Ich – "Einer von Zweien"; 2011: Lady Gaga – "You And I"; 2011: George Acosta feat. Emma Lock – "Never Fear"; 2013: Schiller – "Lichtermeer"; 2013: Dimitri Vegas & Like Mike - "Stay A While"; 2015: Ellie Goulding – "Love Me Like You Do"; 2019: Alle Farben feat. James Blunt – "Walk Away"; 2020: Pascal Letoublon – "Friendships (Lost My Love)"; 2021: ATB, Topic, A7S - Your Love (9PM) (Sequential One Remix); 2023: VISIONV feat. PHEA - Lonely; 2024: Zerb – Mwaki (ATB Anthem Remix); 2024: Cosmic Gate – Brave (ATB's Anthem Remix); 2024: Hugel, Topic, Arash – I Adore You
