= Amurai =

Armenian-American DJ (born 1987)

- Born: Manvel Ter-Pogosyan; August 7, 1987 (age 38); Yerevan, Armenia
- Genres: Trance (All-Types), Downtempo
- Occupations: Music Producer, DJ, Songwriter
- Years active: 2005–Present
- Labels: Armada, Black Hole Recordings, Flashover Recordings, Alter Ego
- Website: www.amuraimusic.com

Amurai (birth name Manvel Ter-Pogosyan; born 1987) is an Armenian-American trance music producer, songwriter, and DJ currently residing in Sacramento, California.

== Biography ==
=== As producer ===
Amurai was inspired to begin producing music by ATB's track, 9PM (Till I Come). In 2005 his first track was signed with the US duo Filo & Peri's label "Empire State Records". 'The Amurai EP', which was the title of that release, included two tracks, and was Amurai's first breakthrough release. Mixmag dance music magazine said "'Reminiscent of You' is a solid instrumental but it's 'Beautiful Dreamer' on the flip that steal the show. When the piano drops into the breakdown you'll get goosebumps." Two years later, Amurai collaborated with Static Blue for the track 'After the Sunrise' on Alter Ego Records. This track was remixed by Alex M.O.R.P.H & Woody Van Eyden, as well as Daniel Kandi. Later, he released 'Tears From Armenia' on Solarstone's label "Deep Blue", as an ode to his native country Armenia, which feature the Armenian instrument duduk. In 2008, Amurai collaborated with Jenni Perez and Tiff Lacey, earning him two major releases with Armin Van Buuren's label Armada and Amon Vision, respectively. 'Fallen In Too Deep', which features Jenni Perez, has appeared on such compilations as Ibiza Trance Tunes 2009, Armada Trance 5 and 6, as well as Armada Night "The After."

Throughout his career, the music producer managed to secure releases on some of Europe's most respectable electronic dance music labels such as Armada Recordings and Black Hole Recordings. Amurai, who often finds inspiration from his Armenian roots, has garnered support from high ranking DJs including Tiesto, Armin Van Buuren, ATB, Above & Beyond, Gareth Emery, Roger Shah, Andy Moor, and Dash Berlin among others. Furthermore, Ferry Corsten, a Dutch label owner and DJ, spotted Amurai and featured him in his “Once Upon A Night” compilations. Amurai was the only artist to have two songs featured on each of the 2-part compilation series.

=== As performer ===
In the first quarter of 2009, Amurai started his DJ career by launching his own internationally broadcast electronic radio show called Amurai Global. For two years, the show aired on over 10 online and FM radio stations including Trance.fm, Pure.fm, Ensonic.fm, and Pulzar.fm and was also available as a podcast. In 2010, Amurai joined the LMD Group in Los Angeles and claimed residency on Saturdays at Club Circus. His residency enabled him to DJ alongside artists such as Cosmic Gate, tyDi, Solarstone, Tritonal, Simon Patterson and Solarstone while representing the Trance music scene in Los Angeles. In 2011, Amurai was invited by ATB to participate in "ATB In Concert", hosted in Poznan, Poland, to play live piano and close the concert with a DJ set.

=== As songwriter ===
In 2011, Amurai contributed as a producer and songwriter in developing ATB's ninth studio artist album entitled "Distant Earth." The album peaked at #7 in the German mainstream Billboard Charts and later reached Gold status.

== Songwriting and collaboration credits ==
Year	Artist	Song	Album	Songwriter	Producer
2012	ATB presents Amurai	"Love and Light"	Sunset Beach DJ Session 2	Yes	Yes
2012	ATB feat. Amurai	"All You Took"	Sunset Beach DJ Session 2	Yes	Yes
2011	ATB Feat. Melissa Loretta	"If It's Love"	Distant Earth	No	Yes
2011	ATB with Amurai Feat. Melissa Loretta	"Heartbeat"	Distant Earth	Yes	Yes
2011	ATB feat. Sean Ryan	"Killing Me Inside"	Distant Earth	Yes	Yes
2011	ATB feat. Melissa Loretta	"White Letters"	Distant Earth	Yes	Yes

== Discography ==
=== Original releases ===
Year	Artist	Song	Album	Label
2013	Stoneface and Terminal with Amurai	"Let You Fall"	Be Different	Euphonic
2013	Amurai	"Love & Light (Downtempo Mix)"	Armada Lounge, Vol. 6	Arva (Armada)
2012	Amurai	"Valencia"	Valencia	Songbird (Black Hole Recordings)
2012	ATB feat. Amurai	"All You Took"	Distant Earth	Kontakt
2011	Amurai feat. Sean Ryan	"Killing Me Inside"	Killing Me Inside	Magik Musik (Black Hole Recordings)
2011	ATB with Amurai feat. Melissa Loretta	"Heartbeat"	Distant Earth	Kontakt
2011	Saint X feat. Amurai	"Black Hole"	Black Hole	Freefall
2010	Amurai feat. Rough Duchess	"Infinity"	Once Upon A Night Vol. 2	Premier (Black Hole Recordings)
2010	Amurai	"Angel Cry"	Once Upon A Night Vol. 2	Premier (Black Hole Recordings)
2010	Amurai feat. Melissa Loretta	"Unconditional Love"	Once Upon A Night Vol. 1	Ultra
2009	Manvel Ter-Pogosyan feat. Tiff Lacey	"Sweet Memories"	Sweet Memories	Amon Vision
2009	Manvel Ter-Pogosyan feat. Jenni Perez	"Fallen In Too Deep"	Once Upon A Night Vol. 2	S107 Recordings (Armada)
2008	Manvel Ter-Pogosyan	"Tears of Armenia"	Balearic Sessions EP	Deepblue Records UK
2008	Amurai vs. Saint Jules	"Grand Prix"	Grand Prix	Levare (Flashover)
2007	Amurai vs. Static Blue	"After the Sunrise"	After the Sunrise	Alter Ego Records
2005	Amurai	"Reminiscent of You"	The Amurai EP	Empire State Recordings
2005	Amurai	"Beautiful Dreamer"	The Amurai EP	Empire State Recordings

=== Remix releases ===
Year	Artist	Song	Label
2011	Jamie R	"Morning Drive (Amurai's Yerevan Remix)"	Abora Recordings
2011	Jamie R	"Morning Drive (Amurai's Los Angeles Remix)"	Abora Recordings
2010	Afternova	"Sunset in Dubai (Amurai Remix)"	Abora Recordings
2010	Dash Berlin	"Never Cry Again (Amurai's Los Angeles Mix)"	Aropa (Armada)
2010	Dash Berlin	"Never Cry Again (Amurai's Yerevan Mix)"	Aropa (Armada)
2010	Fender Woods	"Ain't She Pretty (Amurai's Yerevan Mix)"	Premier (Flashover)
2010	Fender Woods	"Ain't She Pretty (Amurai's Los Angeles Mix)"	Premier (Flashover)
2010	George Acosta Feat. Tiff Lacey	"I Know (Amurai Remix)"	Aco Music
2010	Masoud Feat. Josie	"Leave It All Behind (Amurai Remix)"	Levare (Flashover)
2008	Matt Cerf Feat. Jaren	"Walk Away (Manvel Ter-Pogosyan Remix)"	Deepblue Records UK
2008	Double Agents Feat. Aruna	"Electrified (Manvel's Ocean Breeze Mix)"	Metallic
2007	Amurai vs. Static Blue	"After the Sunrise (Manvel Ter-Pogosyan Remix)"	Alter Ego Records
2007	Perpetual Feat. Fisher	"Innocent (Manvel Ter-Pogosyan Remix)"	Enhanced Recordings
2005	Filo & Peri Feat. Fisher	"Closer Now (Amurai Remix)"	Empire State Recordings
2005	Tristraum	"First Embrace (Amurai Club Mix)"	Section 44

== See also ==
- Tiff Lacey
- Masoud
- Tristraum
