= Under the Stars (album) =

Compilation album by ATB
- Released: January 2016
- Genre: Chill-out, ambient
- Length: 1:14:34
- Label: Planetarium Bochum
- Producer: ATB

ATB chronology
Contact (2014)	Under the Stars (2016)	neXt (2017)

Under the Stars is a compilation album released by German DJ André "ATB" Tanneberger, in January 2016.

The album is a special mixed limited edition compilation, just produced for the "ATB Under The Stars" live at the Planetarium Bochum shows, on January 29 and 30, 2016, and only sold there, during the 2 concerts.

The album features some of André's long-date ambient music collaborators, and a new composition by Yoe Mase. It contains songs from the show, including one track, "The Flame", supposed to be included on ATB's then forthcoming tenth album Next (2017), but which did not happen. Nowadays, copies of the album are sold on the internet for over 200 euros.

Under the stars is a unique ATB chillout show, which has been held three times at the Planetarium Bochum.

== Track listing ==
No.	Title	Length
1.	"Street Piano" (Yoe Mase)	3:14
2.	"Sternwanderer" (feat. Anova)	6:09
3.	"Straight To The Stars"	4:21
4.	"A Past Life" (Yoe Mase)	2:04
5.	"Talismanic"	5:31
6.	"Thrive" (Yoe Mase)	4:31
7.	"Love The Silence"	5:30
8.	"The Flame"	3:44
9.	"I Was Driven Into Sunlight" (Yoe Mase)	4:13
10.	"Galaxia"	6:48
11.	"Impurity" (Kaizen & Yoe Mase)	5:18
12.	"When Angels Travel" (feat. Stefan Erbe)	7:15
13.	"Nothing More" (Yoe Mase)	3:36
14.	"Pacific Avenue" (feat. Fade)	6:55
15.	"Trilogie"	5:23
Total length:		01:14:34

Notes

- Title of track 5 incorrectly listed as "Talismaniac".
