= Sunset Beach DJ Session 2 =

Compilation album by ATB
- Released: 10 July 2012
- Recorded: 2012
- Genre: Trance; dance; chill-out
- Length: 2:33:55
- Label: Kontor Records
- Producer: ATB

ATB chronology
Distant Earth Remixed	Sunset Beach DJ Session 2	All The Best

Singles from Sunset Beach DJ Session 2
- 1. "Never Give Up (feat. Ramona Nerra)" Released: 8 June 2012

Sunset Beach DJ Session 2 is a 2012 compilation album by German DJ and producer André Tanneberger (ATB), released in July 2012.

== Background ==
Sunset Beach DJ Session 2 is the second compilation in ATB's Sunset Beach DJ Session series. Similar to the first volume, it features a variety of new club tracks on the first disc, and an overview of select ambient tracks on the second disc.

In an interview, Tanneberger stated that he produced the club track "In and Out of Love", with Rudi Dittmann (also known as Josh Gallahan), and the chill-out track "Sunset Beach", both of which appear on the compilation.

Tanneberger also noted that he experimented with producing a chill-out track for the album in collaboration with Amurai, a producer based in Los Angeles.

== Track listing ==
Disc one

1. "In and Out of Love" – ATB with Rudee featuring Ramona Nerra
2. "Triumph" – Norin & Rad vs. Audien
3. "Baila" – Probe
4. "Never Give Up" – ATB featuring Ramona Nerra
5. "Damaged" – Antillas featuring Fiora
6. "Gypsy Room (Duderstadt Remix)" – Markus Schulz presents Dakota
7. "Ordinary People (D-Mad Remix)" – LTN
8. "Offshore" – Stereojackers
9. "The Last Time (Johan Malmgren 2012 Remix)" – The Thrillseekers featuring Fisher
10. "Follow Up" – The Madison & Simon J
11. "Into the Blue" – Hazem Beltagui
12. "All You Took" – ATB featuring Amurai
13. "For You (Juventa Club Mix)" – Mike Danis
14. "Beautiful Moment" – Fade

Disc two

1. "Sunset Beach" – ATB featuring Anova
2. "Much Too Much (Zetandel Chill Remix)" – Andain
3. "Klangsine" – Klangstein featuring Sine
4. "Love & Light (Downtempo Mix)" – ATB presents Amurai
5. "With You!" – ATB
6. "Superhuman (Titchimoto Remix)" – Virtual Riot featuring Amba Shepherd
7. "Adriatic Sea (DJ Milews RMX)" – Coastline
8. "Time to Slow It Down" – Gary B
9. "Desire" – Polished Chrome
10. "Lost in Time" – Asheni
11. "Room for Happiness (Kaskade's ICE Mix)" – Kaskade featuring Skylar Grey
12. "Beautiful People" – Summer Of Space
13. "Wolke" – Sine
14. "Chillbar" Sine
15. "Fields of Gold" – Eva Cassidy
