= The DJ 6 in the Mix =

Compilation album by ATB
- Released: December 2010
- Recorded: 2010
- Genre: Trance, Dance
- Label: Kontor Records
- Producer: ATB

ATB chronology
The DJ 5 in the Mix (2010)	The DJ 6 in the Mix (2010)

Singles from The DJ 6 in the Mix
- 1. "Twisted Love" Released: 22 January 2011

The DJ 6 in the Mix is the 6th volume from "The DJ in the Mix" series mixed by the German DJ ATB. It was released by Kontor Records on 31 December 2010 and it features tracks produced by George Acosta, Amurai, Andy Duguid, The Thrillseekers, Andain and many more.

The compilation is structured on 3 CDs - CD 1 & 2 contain tracks that ATB is currently spinning during his gigs and the 3rd CD is compiled of tracks that André liked and enjoyed during his career as a DJ as well as producer.

== Track listing ==
=== CD 1 ===
1. Twisted Love
2. George Acosta feat. Fisher - Love Rain Down
3. Shogun feat. Susie - Come With Me
4. Dash Berlin with Cerf, Mitiska & Jaren - Man On The Run [Nic Chagall Remix]
5. Filo & Peri feat. Audrey Gallagher - This Night [Max Graham Mix]
6. Amurai feat. Rough Duchess - Infinity
7. AMEX - Closer
8. Andy Duguid feat. Leah - Miracle Moments
9. Julie Thompson - Shine [JPL & George Hales Remix]
10. Ruben de Ronde - Forever In Our Hearts [Danny Chen Remix]
11. Skytech - Rocket Science
12. Shipstad & Warren - I'm Never Alone
13. Juventa - Only Us

=== CD 2 ===
1. Sneijder - Away From Here [Arty Remix]
2. Disfunktion - Magna
3. EDX & Tamra Keenan - Out Of The Rain [Sebastian Krieg & Roman F. Arena Mix]
4. Phil Fuldner - Spyderman
5. Tim Berg, Oliver Ingrosso, Otto Knows - iTrack
6. The Thrillseekers - Synaesthesia [Vegas Baby! Remix]
7. Josh Gallahan - Sunday Afternoon
8. Soarsweep - Madarika Beach
9. Marsbeing - Open Your Eyes
10. Schodt - You & Me
11. Tom Fall & Somethings Good - Reflections [Sundriver Remix]
12. T.O.M. - Monsoon [Jason Van Wyk Remix]
13. Ferry Tayle - The Prestige [Temple One Pres. Tu Casa Remix]
14. Matt Millon - Tattoo

=== CD 3 ===
1. Ecstasy [Special US Intro Mix]
2. Max Graham feat. Ana Criado - Nothing Else Matters [Aly & Fila Remix]
3. Oliver Smith - Cirrus
4. Alex Bartlett feat. Anthya - Touch The Sun [Duende Dub Remix]
5. Luminary - Amsterdam [Smith & Pledger Remix]
6. Akesson - Perfect Blue
7. Rusch & Murray - Epic [Above & Beyond Remix]
8. Andain - Beautiful Things [Gabriel & Dresden Unplugged Mix]
9. First State feat. Anita Kelsey - Falling
10. Signalrunners & Julie Thompson - These Shoulders [Oliver Smith Remix]
11. Sundriver - Feel [Nitrous Oxide Remix]
12. Above & Beyond vs. Andy Moor - Air For Life

== Chart performance ==
Chart (2011)	Peak position
Austrian Albums (Ö3 Austria)	66
