= Sign of the Times (Cosmic Gate album) =

Studio album by Cosmic Gate
- Released: 23 March 2009
- Genre: Dance
- Length: 77:58
- Label: Black Hole Recordings
- Producer: Cosmic Gate

Cosmic Gate chronology
Earth Mover (2006)	Sign of the Times (2009)	Back 2 the Future (2011)

Singles from Sign Of The Times
- 1. "Not Enough Time" Released: April 28, 2009; 2. "Sign Of The Times / F.A.V." Released: May 11, 2009; 3. "Flatline" Released: July 27, 2009; 4. "Under Your Spell" Released: October 13, 2009; 5. "London Rain" Released: June 28, 2010

Professional ratings
Review scores
Source	Rating
BS-Live	not rated

Sign of the Times is the fourth studio album by trance duo Cosmic Gate. It was released on March 23, 2009, in Germany. A deluxe edition was released and included remixes of the original songs by other DJs such as Arty and Markus Schulz.

== Track listings ==
=== CD and digital download ===
Sign of the Times

1. "Open Your Heart" (7:05) (featuring Tiff Lacey)
2. "London Rain" (6:06) (featuring Jan Loechel)
3. "Flatline" (6:35) (featuring Kyler England)
4. "Sign Of The Times" (6:08)
5. "Under Your Spell" (5:24) (featuring Aruna)
6. "Not Enough Time" (5:40) (featuring Emma Hewitt)
7. "FAV" (6:32)
8. "Trip To PD" (6:34)
9. "Only Time" (4:46) (featuring Tommy Clint)
10. "Arctic Sunset" (6:14)
11. "Body Of Conflict" (5:14) (featuring Denise Rivera)
12. "Whatever" (6:15)
13. "Seize The Day" (4:55) (featuring Jan Loechel aka Jades)

=== CD ===
Sign of the Times (Deluxe Edition)

Disc 1

1. "Open Your Heart" (7:05) (featuring Tiff Lacey)
2. "London Rain" (6:06) (featuring Jan Loechel)
3. "Flatline" (6:35) (featuring Kyler England)
4. "Sign Of The Times" (6:08)
5. "Under Your Spell" (5:24) (featuring Aruna)
6. "Not Enough Time" (5:40) (featuring Emma Hewitt)
7. "FAV" (6:32)
8. "Trip To PD" (6:34)
9. "Only Time" (4:46) (featuring Tommy Clint)
10. "Arctic Sunset" (6:14)
11. "Body Of Conflict" (5:14) (featuring Denise Rivera)
12. "Whatever" (6:15)
13. "Seize The Day" (4:55) (featuring Jan Loechel aka Jades)

Disc 2

1. "FAV (Arty Remix)" (6:45)
2. "Open Your Heart (Steve Brian Remix)" (6:57) (featuring Tiff Lacey)
3. "Seize The Day (Cold Blue Remix)" (7:16) (featuring Jan Loechel aka Jades)
4. "Not Enough Time (Raver Rework)" (7:18) (featuring Emma Hewitt)
5. "Sign Of The Times (George Acosta Remix)" (8:06)
6. "Not Enough Time (Club Mix)" (8:36) (featuring Emma Hewitt)
7. "Not Enough Time (Sied van Riel Remix)" (8:11) (featuring Emma Hewitt)
8. "Not Enough Time (Andy Duguid Remix)" (7:44) (featuring Emma Hewitt)
9. "Sign Of The Times (Markus Schulz Remix)" (8:21)
10. "Flatline (Kyau & Albert Remix)" (6:35) (featuring Kyler England)
11. "Flatline (Wally Lopez Factomania Dub)" (8:01) (featuring Kyler England)
12. "Under Your Spell (Myon & Shane 54 Remix)" (7:38) (featuring Aruna)
13. "Under Your Spell (Duderstadt Remix)" (7:47) (featuring Aruna)
14. "London Rain (New Club Mix)" (7:03) (featuring Jan Loechel)
15. "London Rain (Stoneface & Terminal Remix)" (7:47) (featuring Jan Loechel)

=== Digital download ===
Sign of the Times (Deluxe Edition)

1. "Open Your Heart" (7:05) (featuring Tiff Lacey)
2. "London Rain" (6:06) (featuring Jan Loechel)
3. "Flatline" (6:35) (featuring Kyler England)
4. "Sign Of The Times" (6:08)
5. "Under Your Spell" (5:24) (featuring Aruna)
6. "Not Enough Time" (5:40) (featuring Emma Hewitt)
7. "FAV" (6:32)
8. "Trip To PD" (6:34)
9. "Only Time" (4:46) (featuring Tommy Clint)
10. "Arctic Sunset" (6:14)
11. "Body Of Conflict" (5:14) (featuring Denise Rivera)
12. "Whatever" (6:15)
13. "Seize The Day" (4:55) (featuring Jan Loechel aka Jades)
14. "FAV (Arty Remix)" (6:45)
15. "Open Your Heart (Steve Brian Remix)" (6:57) (featuring Tiff Lacey)
16. "Seize The Day (Cold Blue Remix)" (7:16) (featuring Jan Loechel aka Jades)
17. "Not Enough Time (Raver Rework)" (7:18) (featuring Emma Hewitt)
18. "Sign Of The Times (George Acosta Remix)" (8:06)
19. "Not Enough Time (Club Mix)" (8:36) (featuring Emma Hewitt)
20. "Not Enough Time (Sied van Riel Remix)" (8:11) (featuring Emma Hewitt)
21. "Not Enough Time (Andy Duguid Remix)" (7:44) (featuring Emma Hewitt)
22. "Sign Of The Times (Markus Schulz Remix)" (8:21)
23. "FAV (Hard Dub") (8:01)
24. "Flatline (Kyau & Albert Remix)" (6:35) (featuring Kyler England)
25. "Flatline (Row Remix)" (7:00) (featuring Kyler England)
26. "Flatline (Wally Lopez Factomania Dub)" (8:01) (featuring Kyler England)
27. "Under Your Spell (Myon & Shane 54 Remix)" (7:38) (featuring Aruna)
28. "Under Your Spell (Duderstadt Remix)" (7:47) (featuring Aruna)
29. "London Rain (New Club Mix)" (7:03) (featuring Jan Loechel)
30. "London Rain (Stoneface & Terminal Remix)" (7:47) (featuring Jan Loechel)
31. "London Rain (Ruben de Ronde Remix)" (7:09) (featuring Jan Loechel)
32. "London Rain (Suspect 44 Remix)" (8:12) (featuring Jan Loechel)
33. "London Rain (Back 2 Back 4 Redub)" (7:41) (featuring Jan Loechel)
