= Aruna (singer) =

American singer-songwriter

- Born: Aruna Beth Abrams; January 16, 1975 (age 51); Flemington, New Jersey, U.S.
- Genres: Trance, progressive house
- Occupations: Singer, songwriter, DJ
- Instruments: Vocals, piano
- Labels: Enhanced Music, Armada Music, Anjunabeats, Black Hole, Monstercat
- Website: http://www.arunamusic.com

Aruna Beth Abrams (born January 16, 1975) is an American singer, songwriter, DJ, producer and pianist. She is best known as a vocalist in dance music since 2007 but has been working as DJ and producer of her own work since 2011. She resides in Los Angeles, California.

== Early life and career ==
Aruna grew up in Flemington, New Jersey, the daughter of Beatrice and Larry S. Abrams, a clinical pharmaceutical researcher. Her name was suggested by her Indian godfather and means "sunrise" in Hindi. She began studying classical piano and later, jazz improvisation, and left her hometown to study piano as well as film scoring and electronic music production at the Berklee College of Music, Boston. In 1996 she worked on the 'Portal' project together with members of the progressive metal band Cynic, providing vocals and keyboards. This material was eventually released in 2012 as The Portal Tapes, under the Cynic name. At Berklee, Abrams completed courses in music production, audio editing and sound design. She graduated in 2002.

Growing up, Abrams listened mostly to 70s and 80s pop, which changed when 'my tastes started diversifying and I got into hair, thrash and death metal as a teen'. She first began performing as an acoustic singer-songwriter at local coffee houses in Boston, and recorded the three-song demo Broken Circles, produced by Alain Mallet and mixed by Kevin Killen. In 2000 she was selected as the opening act for the Boston show of The Girls Room Tour showcase.

After graduating college, Abrams relocated to Los Angeles. In 2004, she recorded and self-released her first full-length album, Running Red Lights. While pursuing a career as a pop singer-songwriter, Aruna experienced early success when a number of her songs were featured on the MTV shows, Laguna Beach and The Hills. Her break-through was the co-written hit for Miley Cyrus entitled "I Got Nerve" for the 2006 No. 1 Billboard album, the Hannah Montana: Season One soundtrack. The song reached No. 67 on the Billboard Hot 100.

== EDM vocals and songwriting career ==
In 2006, she was discovered through MySpace by her manager Stuart Squires, who began pitching her for dance collaborations. Six months later, Abrams was approached by The Thrillseekers to feature her vocals on a track. The collaboration was her introduction into the EDM world, supplying the track "Waiting Here For You". She has continued to work with other trance acts, including Cosmic Gate, ATB, Ronski Speed and Roger Shah. Together with Mark Eteson she recorded the single "Let Go", which was released on October 25, 2010, through the Anjunabeats label and later included on theVolume 8 compilation from the same label. Two years later the single "Live Forever" with Ferry Corsten was released and featured on the album WKND. She also appeared in her first video for the song. In 2013 she went on to collaborate with Armin van Buuren on "Won’t Let You Go" for his artist album Intense. On these collaborations she noted that 'writing my own lyrics and melodies is and has always been a non-negotiable. I just can't sell a song I didn't write in the quite same way'.

In the beginning of 2009, she was contacted by Myon (Mario Egeto) of DJ duo Myon & Shane 54 to work together on a track. After releasing "Helpless," both parties had ideas for track collaborations that didn't fit into their own artist personas, so the trio formed a new side project that they dubbed Velvetine. "Safe" was the first original track released by Velvetine in 2010 on Anjunabeats Volume 7 and was warmly received by fans and by Armin van Buuren, who crafted an intro mix for it and a mashup version with his track, "Face to Face". Velvetine's second single "The Great Divide" was released in 2012, reached No. 1 on the Beatport trance and dubstep charts and first played by Armin on A State of Trance #573.

== DJ and production career ==
In 2011, Abrams decided to move into DJing, and has credited Myon & Shane 54 as the inspiration for her to make the transition. She started her own radio show, The Hot List in September 2011on DI.fm. In August 2012, she became the first solo female act to do a guest mix for Above & Beyond’s Trance Around the World radio show. Afterwards, The Hot List reached No. 14 on the iTunes Top 200 Music Podcasts chart. Touted by Tony McGuiness of Above & Beyond as "one of the most talented singer/songwriters around at the moment". Aruna joined Above & Beyond for a second time in November 2013, doing a guest mix for their podcast, Group Therapy.

In 2012, Aruna performed on the "A State of Pink" stage at Armin van Buuren's A State of Trance 550 festival in Den Bosch, Netherlands. A year later, she accompanied him with live vocals during his set at the Hollywood Palladium in LA. She has also performed live at Nocturnal Wonderland, Avalon Hollywood alongside Ferry Corsten and at Exchange LA with Myon & Shane54. She has performed live vocals and DJ sets internationally.

Abrams moved to the UK-based record label Enhanced Recordings in 2013. Her solo track "Reason to Believe" was her first single with the label and reached the No. 3 position on the Beatport Trance chart in August 2013. Remixes to "Reason to Believe" peaked at No. 7 and No. 9 in the Glitch Hop and Chillout charts, the latter a mix she self-produced. In 2014, Abrams released Amsterdam Enhanced together with AWD.

In 2015 she released the compilation Aruna - The Hot List Volume One a DJ Mix including her own work both as vocalist, remixer and producer. In support the digital single 'What If?' was made available. She has continued to write, produce and DJ, concentrating mostly on drum and bass.

In November 2016, she released the single "Ready To Go" with English music producer Rameses B featuring American vocalist Kingdøms on Monstercat. She also contributed to the remix of 'Time To Say Goodbye' by Mr FijiWiji originally from the Dogma EP. In 2017 she co-wrote the song 'Trust You' for the album Trust by the singer Jaqi Velasquez that reached No. 7 on the Billboard Latin Pop Album chart.

In September 2019, she made a return to the live stage as vocalist when she appeared at the Electric FAIRy tale festival.

== Style ==
Abrams 'went through the requisite Lilith phase' in college listening to mostly female artist such as Tori Amos and Sarah McLachlan. It began to influence most of her writing and 'it was around that time that I really began consciously honing my craft'.

During her career, Abrams has written a large number of trance tracks where she found herself 'limited by their structure, and also the imagery that they impose from a lyrical perspective, since the tracks and the sounds in trance are so big and lush and epic, the lyrics kinda have to follow suit, so they end up being somewhat abstract'. In general, her method of working centres on the melody before the lyrics are written. Abrams prefers 'the intimacy of pop lyric writing and arrangements, which allow the melody and the story of the song to be the main focus, not the kick drum and the lead lines'.

== Discography ==
EPs

- 2001: Broken Circles

Albums

- 2004: Running Red Lights

Compilation

- 2015: Aruna - The Hot List Volume One

Featured singles

- 2007: The Thrillseekers feat. Aruna – Waiting Here for You
- 2008: Double Agents feat. Aruna – Electrified
- 2008: George Acosta feat. Aruna - Fallin' Backwards
- 2008: Ronski Speed feat. Aruna - All the Way - Pure Devotion
- 2009: Cosmic Gate feat. Aruna - Under Your Spell - Sign of the Times
- 2009: Filo & Peri feat. Aruna - Ashley - Nightplay
- 2009: ATB feat. Aruna - My Saving Grace - Future Memories
- 2009: Myon & Shane 54 feat. Aruna - Helpless
- 2009: DJ Shah Feat. Aruna – Now or Never - Songbook
- 2010: Velvetine – Safe (Wherever You Are)
- 2010: Mike Shiver & Aruna - Everywhere You Are
- 2010: Aruna with Mark Eteson - Let Go
- 2011: Cosmic Gate & Myon & Shane 54 feat. Aruna - All Around You - Wake Your Mind
- 2011: Cosmic Gate feat. Aruna - Free Falling (Barra) - Wake Your Mind
- 2012: Ferry Corsten feat. Aruna - Live Forever - WKND
- 2012: Velvetine - The Great Divide
- 2012: Markus Schulz feat. Aruna - Sing Me Back to Life - Scream
- 2012: Aruna - Save the Day
- 2013: Myon & Shane 54 with Aruna - Lights
- 2013: Armin van Buuren feat. Aruna - Won't Let You Go - Intense
- 2013: Aruna - Reason to Believe
- 2013: Conjure One feat. Aruna - Still Holding On
- 2014: Aruna - Start a Fire (Johan Malmgren Original Mix)
- 2014: Aly & Fila feat. Aruna - The Other Shore
- 2015: Aruna - The End (Husman Vs. Aruna Club Mix)
- 2015: Boom Jinx with Aruna - Light as a Feather
- 2016: Mr FijiWiji, Direct & Aruna - Time to Say Goodbye
- 2016: Aruna & Rameses B - Ready To Go (feat. KINGDØMS)
- 2016: Aruna - What If/Sunrise
- 2016: Aruna - All Of You (Ost & Meyer Vs. Aruna Mix)
