= Future Memories =

Studio album by ATB
- Released: 1 May 2009 (Europe)
- Recorded: 2008–2009
- Genres: Trance; dance; chill-out
- Label: Kontor (Germany)
- Producer: ATB

ATB chronology
Trilogy (2007)	Future Memories (2009)	Distant Earth (2011)

Singles from Future Memories
- 1. "What About Us/LA Nights" Released: May 2009; 2. "Behind" Released: July 2009

Future Memories is the seventh studio album by German artist ATB, released on 1 May 2009.

Just like Two Worlds (2000) and Trilogy (2007) before it, this album also features two CDs. The first CD consists of dance songs, while the second one features chill-out tunes. Similarly to Trilogy, Future Memories also features 26 tracks in total and is released in two different versions: a normal one with two CDs, and a limited edition, which includes a DVD.

On the iTunes version of the album there are two bonus tracks, a full-length club remix of "L.A. Nights" and a 12-minute minimix featuring most songs from the album. This minimix was used to promote the album on YouTube.

== Overview ==
ATB made almost all announcements concerning this new album on his MySpace blog. The first thing he said was that the album would not be promoted in the old-fashioned way, and a single would not be released before the album. Instead, there would be three tracks released at the same time (two of which are "What About Us" and "L.A. Nights") to represent the main album, and all three of them were going to have their own music videos. Also, four tracks on the album were going to have more than 160 beats per minute (bpm), rare in ATB's songs, but they were not anything close to the hardcore genre. The reason for some of the songs' high bpm was that for the first time in ATB's repertoire, he has incorporated drum and bass elements into some of the songs such as "What About Us" and "My Everything".

The opening to the song "Gravity" is similar melodically to the opening track on ATB's first album Movin' Melodies, entitled "The First Tones".

On 30 March 2009 ATB published a preview on YouTube that featured 10 selected tracks from the album, including "What About Us", "My Everything", "Summervibes with 9PM" and others.

Many singers and artists collaborated with ATB on this album, including Josh Gallahan, Haley Gibby (from Summer of Space), Betsie Larkin, Aruna, Tiff Lacey, Roberta Carter-Harrison (from Wild Strawberries), Apple&Stone, Jades and Flanders.

== Track listing ==
ATB announced the official track list on 27 March 2009 on his MySpace blog.

Future Memories – CD 1
No.	Title	Writer(s)	Length
1.	"L.A. Nights"	André Tanneberger	4:32
2.	"What About Us" (feat. Jan Löchel)	Tanneberger, Jan Löchel	5:35
3.	"Swept Away" (feat. Roberta Carter Harrison)	Tanneberger, Ken Harrison	6:40
4.	"A New Day" (feat. Betsie Larkin)	Tanneberger, Elizabeth Larkin	4:59
5.	"My Everything" (feat. Tiff Lacey)	Tanneberger, Tiff Lacey	5:04
6.	"Summervibes With 9PM"	Tanneberger	5:30
7.	"Gravity" (feat. Haley Gibby)	Tanneberger, Finn Bjarnson, Ryan Raddon	5:56
8.	"Luminescence" (ATB presents Josh Gallahan)	Rudi Dittmann	4:29
9.	"Behind" (ATB presents Flanders)	Alessandro Bunetto, Francesco Abbate, Giuliana Fraglica, Marco Giudice, Vincenzo Callea	3:58
10.	"Future Memories"	Tanneberger	5:57
11.	"Still Here" (feat. Tiff Lacey)	Tanneberger, Lacey	5:36
12.	"My Saving Grace" (feat. Aruna Abrams)	Tanneberger, Aruna Abrams, Dittmann	4:08
13.	"Terra 260273"	Tanneberger	5:47
14.	"Communicate" (ATB presents Jades feat. Jan Löchel)	Tanneberger, Jan Löchel, Dittmann	4:05

Future Memories – CD 2
No.	Title	Writer(s)	Length
1.	"Talismanic"	Tanneberger, Dittmann	5:46
2.	"Missing" (feat. Tiff Lacey)	Tanneberger, Ben Watt, Tracey Thorn	4:16
3.	"Horizon"	Tanneberger	6:24
4.	"Voices"	Tanneberger	4:33
5.	"Behind" (ATB's Ambient Version) (ATB presents Flanders)	Alessandro Bunetto, Francesco Abbate, Giuliana Fraglica, Marco Giudice, Vincenzo Callea	3:42
6.	"Authentic Reaction" (ATB presents Apple & Stone)	Róbert Janíček	3:55
7.	"Careless"	Tanneberger, Dittmann	7:07
8.	"Twilight"	Tanneberger, Dittmann	6:38
9.	"Listen To Me"	Tanneberger	4:09
10.	"Living Life Over"	Tanneberger, Dittmann	5:37
11.	"Silent Meaning"	Tanneberger	5:34
12.	"Malibu Road"		4:22

Future Memories – Europe and Asia Limited Edition DVD
No.	Title	Length
1.	"The World Behind" (Travelogue)
2.	"The World Behind" (Making The Album)
3.	"What About Us" (The Video)

== Charts and certifications ==
=== Charts ===
Chart (2009)	Peak position
German Albums (Offizielle Top 100)	12
Hungarian Albums (MAHASZ)	28
Polish Albums (ZPAV)	14
US Top Dance Albums (Billboard)	14

=== Certifications ===
Region	Certification	Certified units/sales
Poland (ZPAV)	Platinum	20,000^{*}
^{*} Sales figures based on certification alone.
