= Thomas Kukula =

German DJ and musician

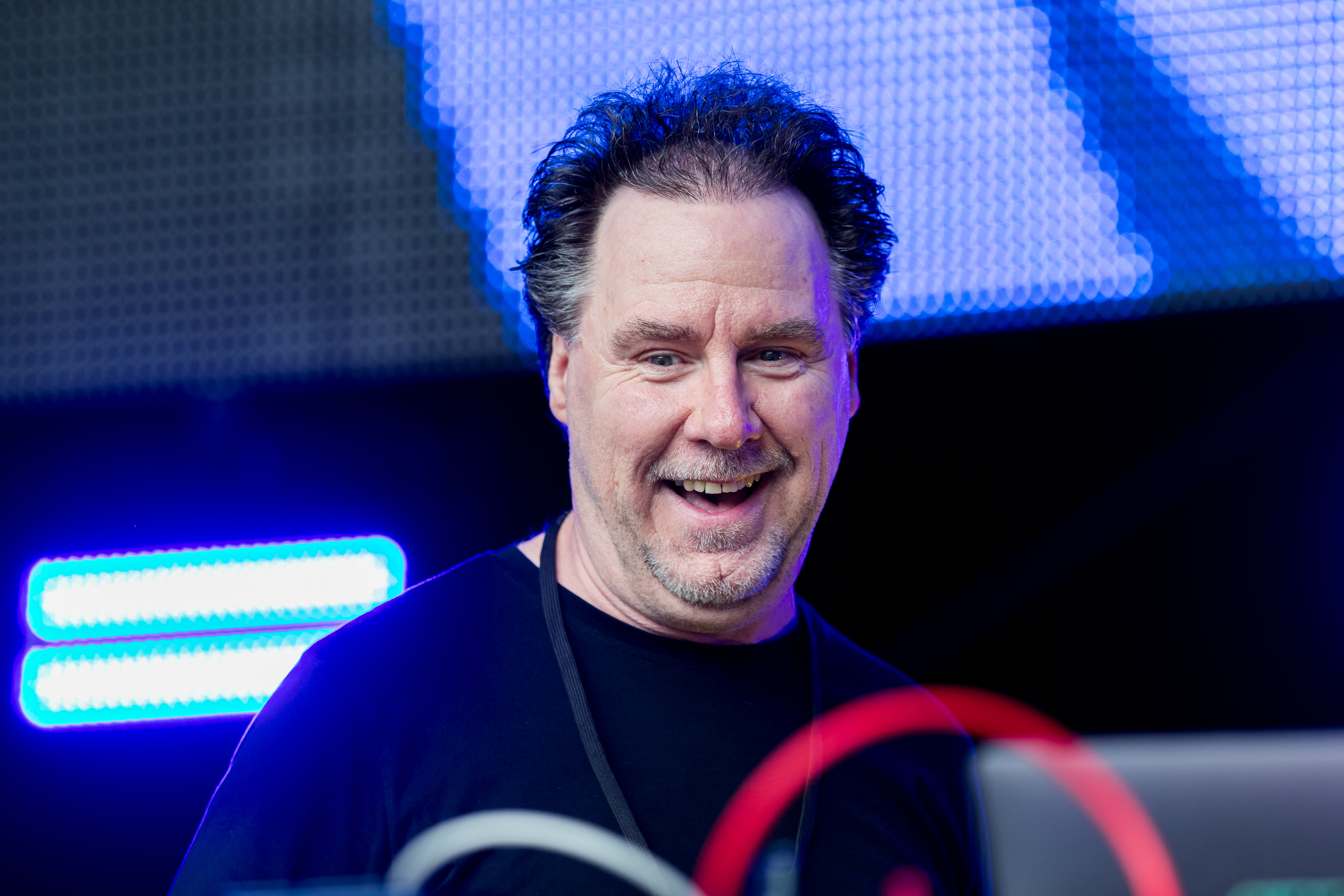
Kukula at Sunshine Live - Die 90er Live on Stage Sommeredition (2023)

Thomas Kukula (born 1965 in Düsseldorf) is a German DJ, Eurodance musician and music producer, that released music under monikers such as General Base, Candy Beat, T.H.K. and Red 5.

== Life and career ==
Kukula started working as a DJ in 1986 in his hometown Düsseldorf. Two years later he became resident DJ in the Tarm Center in Bochum. Soon he started to produce his own music. His first project was General Base.

The first General Base single Mein Gott, es ist voller Sterne was released in 1991. In 1992 he released his debut album First and the singles Back Again, Apache (a cover version of Apache by The Shadows from 1960), In Trance, Bidi, Bidi - Do You Wanna Dance, Marilyn Monroe and Poison.

The album First entered the German Media Control Charts in 1993 and reached number 82. The single Poison also became a hit, mainly due to the vocals of Claudja Barry.

Besides he also released as Candy Beat and T.H.K. Other projects were not that successful. In 1998 Kukula started his new project Red 5 and entered the German charts with the hit Da Beat Goes. He later changed the name to DJ Red 5. The follow-up singles I Love You Stop...!, For This World and Lift Me Up also entered the German charts.

Kukula also remixed tracks by Moby, Bass Bumpers, Maxx, The Good Men, Sequential One, Sheeva and United DJs.

He is living and working in Oberhausen.

== Discography ==
=== Albums ===
List of albums, with selected chart positions
Title	Album details	Peak chart positions
Title	Album details	GER
First	Released: 1993; Label: Roughmix	83

=== Charting singles ===
List of singles, with selected chart positions
Title	Year	Chart positions	Album
Title	Year	AUS	Album
"In Trance"	1993	152	First
"Apache"	1993	101	First
"Poison"	1994	127	First
