= Mars & Mystre =

- Origin: San Francisco, California
- Genres: Cyber Trance Music
- Years active: 1996 -
- Labels: Frequency 8

Mars & Mystre, a.k.a. Michael Robbins (Mars) and Eric Newman (Mystre), are considered San Francisco's trance pioneers.

== Cybertrance Parties ==
The original mixtapes of Mars vs. Mystre were released in 1997 and 1998, and from around 1996 to 2000, the pair would throw raves in and around San Francisco. The announcements for these and other rave / underground parties were stored on the SF Raves bulletin board / mailing list maintained by Brian Behlendorf.

== Mainstream success ==
Dedicated to spreading the sound of Cybertrance, Mars opened Frequency 8, America's first record store dedicated to the trance movement. From the success of Frequency 8, Mars would go on to create his own international record label and event organization of the same name.

In 2000, Mars and Mystre released their best-selling two-CD compilation album, "Faith In 2000". The album included fifteen tracks by artists like Art Of Trance, DJ Tandu, and ATB. Mars & Mystre included several tracks they produced together, such as Electric Blue, Save the Rave, and Eye in the Sky, all released on vinyl for their international record label Frequency 8. Both also worked with Germany's Nostrum (Bernd Augustinski) on "Eye In The Sky". Mars also collaborated with Nostrum under the alias Red Rock Project on a track called "Mystic Ways ".

Shortly after the release of Faith in 2000, they parted ways, and Mars embarked on his solo career. The record store, Frequency 8, located on Haight Street, was briefly changed to "Reverb Records" and was run by DJ Mystre (Eric Newman) before finally going out of business.

In 2002, before the San Francisco Frequency 8 store shut down, they opened other locations in the Westwooddistrict of Los Angeles near UCLA, and on Broadway in Seattle's Capitol Hill neighborhood. However, after the invention of free online music, all stores eventually closed.

== Select discography ==
=== Albums ===
- Mars vs. Mystre vol 1 (1997)
- Mars vs. Mystre vol 2 (1998)
- Faith in 2000
- Alienaided- Mars
- Sonic Sunrise- Mars

=== Singles ===
- Electric Blue (Produced by Oliver Lieb)
