= The DJ 5 in the Mix =

Compilation album by ATB
- Released: January 12, 2010
- Recorded: 2010
- Genre: Trance
- Producer: ATB

ATB chronology
The DJ 4 in the Mix (2007)	The DJ 5 in the Mix (2010)	The DJ 6 in the Mix (2010)

The DJ 5 In The Mix is the fifth DJ mix compilation by German producer and remixer ATB, which was released on January 12, 2010. The DJ 5 is a triple-CD album, and includes songs by various DJs and producers, all mixed and compiled by ATB.

ATB has collaborated with many important artists for this release, including Ferry Corsten.

== Track listing ==
=== Disc 1 ===
1. ATB - 9 PM Reloaded [Club Version] [Version]
2. Fischerspooner - Supply & Demand
3. Arty - Gentle Touch
4. Alpha9 - Bliss [Alpha Club Mix]
5. Dash Berlin With Cerf, Mitiska & Jaren - Man on the Run
6. Cor Fijneman Feat. Melissa Mathes - Disappear [Carlos Sun Juan Remix]
7. Jaco - Unreachable
8. ATB Pres. Flanders - Behind [EDX Ibiza Sunrise Remix]
9. Simon Patterson - Different Feeling
10. Estiva - I Feel Fine [Piano Mix]
11. Signalrunners - Meet Me In Montauk
12. JPL - Waking Up With You
13. DJ Tatana - Somebody [Leventina Remix]
14. Mossy - Come With Me

=== Disc 2 ===
1. ATB - Gravity [2010 ATB Club Mix]
2. Kyau & Albert - I Love You [Cosmic Gate Remix]
3. Steve Brian - Starlight
4. Josh Gallahan - Shades of Love
5. ATB, Tanneberger, Andre - L.A. Nights [ATB's 2010 Energy Club Mix]
6. Cold Blue - Fever
7. Akesson* - Flavour Park
8. ATB & Josh Gallahan - Mythology
9. JPL - Summer Skin
10. Ferry Tayle & Static Blue - L'Acrobat
11. Henrik Christensen - Overseas
12. Oliver Smith - Cirrus
13. Adam Nickey - Callista
14. Ronski Speed - Aural Slave [Thomas Datt Remix]
15. Walsh & McAuley - Beyond Belief

=== Disc 3 ===
1. Dance 2 Trance - Hello San Francisco
2. Zyon - No Fate [Struggle Continuous Mix]
3. Energy 52 - Cafe Del Mar [Three N One Remix]
4. Chicane Feat. Moya Brennan - Saltwater
5. Hidden Logic Pres. Luminary - Wasting
6. Breakfast (3) - Dancing in the Moonlight
7. Jam & Spoon - Stella
8. Three Drives - Greece 2000
9. Airwave - When Things Go Wrong
10. Ferry Corsten Pres. Moonman - Galaxia
11. Andain - Beautiful Things [Gabriel & Dresden Unplugged Mix]
12. Moby - Go
13. Cosmic Baby - Liebe

== Charts ==
Chart performance for The DJ 5 in the Mix
Chart (2010)	Peak position
Polish Albums (ZPAV)	17
