= Mr FijiWiji =

- Born: Brendan Matthew Galdo; October 5, 1995 (age 30); Pittsburgh, Pennsylvania, U.S.
- Origin: Columbus, Ohio, U.S.
- Genres: EDM; dubstep; chillout; UK garage; future garage; future house; deep house; trip hop; ambient breaks
- Occupations: Record producer; songwriter; DJ
- Years active: 2011–present
- Labels: Monstercat; Enhanced Music; Kannibalen Records
- Website: www.mrfijiwiji.com

Brendan Matthew Galdo (born October 5, 1995), better known by his stage name Mr FijiWiji, is an American electronic music producer, known for producing chill-out, future and dubstep songs. Galdo peaked at No. 12 on Billboard's Next Big Sound chart in January 2016.

== History ==
In 2011, Galdo was signed onto the Canadian record label Monstercat for his (original) song, Insomnia and has since had several songs and EPs released by the record label. Galdo has also produced several remixes of Aruna, Myon & Shane 54, Taylr Renee, and Bingo Players. He has also collaborated with Tritonal.

In 2013, Joseph Lyncheski (better known as his stage name Direct) introduced Galdo to future & deep house when they both met each other for the first time. Galdo instantly grew interest in the genres and created two songs Out on a Limb and Let Me Out as a result. Lyncheski and Galdo have since collaborated on multiple songs, notably the deep house song 'Entropy'.

In 2014, Galdo collaborated with duo Tritonal to create the song Seraphic. The duo grew inspiration from chillout and ambient music and wanted to collaborate with Galdo as a result. In the same year, Galdo departed from high school and moved into college, having to deal with the variety of emotions in the process. As a result, he created the EP Growing Up to show that not only is he growing in life as a person, he is also growing up as an artist.

In 2016, Galdo released his fourth EP, entitled 'Dogma'. The EP contains a collaboration with Direct and Aruna, as well as Lucas Marx, son of pop/rock star Richard Marx and Anna Yvette as featured vocalists. In the week of January 23, Galdo peaked at number 12 on Billboard's Next Big Sound chart.

== Discography ==
=== Albums and EPs ===
Title	Details
Keeping It Surreal	Released: January 4, 2012; Label: Monstercat; Format: Digital download
Friends EP	Released: October 16, 2013; Label: Monstercat; Format: Digital download
Growing Up EP	Released: February 13, 2015; Label: Monstercat; Format: Digital download
Yours Truly (feat. Danyka Nadeau) (The Remixes)	Released: September 25, 2015; Label: Monstercat; Format: Digital download
Dogma EP	Released: May 18, 2016; Label: Monstercat; Format: Digital download
Lost Lost Lost	Released: April 20, 2018; Label: Spaceman Recordings; Format: Digital download
Musician Again	Released: December 31, 2022; Label: Spaceman Recordings; Format: Digital download

==== As a featured artist ====
Title	Details
Start A Fire (Remixes) by Aruna	Released: July 28, 2014; Label: Enhanced Recordings; Format: Digital download
The Girl (The remixes) by Hellberg	Released: July 13, 2015; Label: Monstercat; Format: Digital download
Hold (Remixes) by Dabin	Released: June 7, 2016; Label: Kannibalen Records; Format: Digital download
Matches (The Remixes) by Ephixa & Stephen Walking	Released: November 8, 2016; Label: Monstercat; Format: Digital download
Cold Skin (The Remixes) by Seven Lions & Echos	Released: June 13, 2017; Label: Monstercat; Format: Digital download

=== Singles ===
Year	Title	Album	Label
2011	Insomnia	Monstercat 003 – Momentum, Keeping It Surreal	Monstercat
2011	Doesn't Feel like Christmas	Monstercat Christmas Album 2011	Monstercat
2012	Gina	Monstercat 005 – Evolution, Keeping It Surreal	Monstercat
2012	Let The Sky Fall Down	Non-album single	Self-released
2012	The Mentalist	Monstercat 011 – Revolution	Monstercat
2012	Imaginary Friend	Monstercat Christmas Album 2012	Monstercat
2012	Apathy (featuring CoMa)	Non-album single	Self-released
2013	Cynical (featuring CoMa)	Monstercat 012 – Aftermath	Monstercat
2013	Science Is Cool	Non-album single	Self-released
2013	Hysteria (with Direct)	Monstercat 014 – Discovery	Monstercat
2013	Sentient (with Tülpa)	Friends EP, Monstercat 015 – Outlook	Monstercat
2013	Let Me Out	Monstercat 016 – Expedition	Monstercat
2014	Out on a Limb (featuring Jonny Rose)	Monstercat 017 – Ascension	Monstercat
2014	Pure Sunlight (with Laura Brehm & AgNO3)	Monstercat 018 – Frontier	Monstercat
2014	Seraphic (with Tritonal)	Metamorphic III	Enhanced Recordings
2014	Entropy (with Direct)	Monstercat 019 – Endeavor	Monstercat
2015	Believe Her (featuring Meron Ryan)	Monstercat 020 – Altitude, Growing Up EP	Monstercat
2015	Yours Truly (featuring Danyka Nadeau)	Monstercat 021 – Perspective, Growing Up EP	Monstercat
2015	Growing Up (featuring Openwater)	Monstercat 021 – Perspective, Growing Up EP	Monstercat
2015	Aphasia	Monstercat 023 – Voyage	Monstercat
2015	We Are the Lights (with Varien)	Monstercat 025 – Threshold	Monstercat
2015	Yours Truly VIP (featuring Danyka Nadeau)	Yours Truly (The Remixes)	Monstercat
2016	Hostage (featuring Anna Yvette)	Dogma EP	Monstercat
2016	Time to Say Goodbye (with Direct & Aruna)	Dogma EP, Monstercat 027 – Cataclysm	Monstercat
2016	Trust in Me (with Direct & Holly Drummond)	Trust in Me EP, Monstercat 029 – Havoc	Monstercat
2016	Drunkard (with Exist Strategy) [featuring Bamiyah]	Non-album single	Spaceman Recordings
2017	Tomorrow (with Direct) [featuring Matt Van & Holly Drummond]	Monstercat Uncaged Vol. 1	Monstercat
2017	Andromeda (with Exist Strategy) [featuring Matt Van]	Monstercat Uncaged Vol. 1	Monstercat
2018	Reality Is More Beautiful (featuring Matt Van)	Lost Lost Lost	Spaceman Recordings
2019	Enough (with Matt Van)	Non-album single	Monstercat
2019	LA2016 (with Direct)	Cold Ground EP	Monstercat

=== Remixes ===
Year	Title	Artist	Label
2012	Aural Psynapse	deadmau5	Self-released
2012	Strobe	deadmau5	Self-released
2013	I Remember (with Laura Brehm)	deadmau5 & Kaskade	Self-released
2013	Fire Inside	Gemini	Self-released
2013	Own It	Drake	Self-released
2014	SexyBack	Justin Timberlake	Self-released
2014	Start a Fire	Aruna	Enhanced Music
2014	Air	Hellberg, Teqq & Taylr Renee	Self-released
2015	Where Are Ü Now (featuring Justin Bieber)	Jack Ü	Self-released
2015	Memory (featuring Holly Drummond)	Direct	Monstercat
2015	The Girl (featuring Cozi Zuehlsdorff)	Hellberg	Monstercat
2015	Burden	Subtact & Jay Rodger	Self-released
2016	It's Strange (featuring K. Flay)	Louis The Child	Self-released
2016	Hold (featuring Daniela Andrade)	Dabin	Kannibalen Records
2016	Matches (featuring Aaron Richards)	Ephixa & Stephen Walking	Monstercat
2016	Fortress (featuring Joni Fatora)	Illenium	Self-released
2017	Cold Skin	Seven Lions & Echos	Monstercat
2017	Between Us	Elenne & Mothica	Self-released

== Awards and nominations ==
=== Accolades ===
Year	Publisher	Country	Accolade	Rank
2016	Billboard	United States	Next Big Sound	12
