= Don't Stop! (ATB song) =

1999 single by ATB

Single by ATB

from the album Movin' Melodies
- Released: 15 March 1999
- Length: 5:49
- Label: Kontor, Motor Music
- Songwriter: André Tanneberger
- Producer: André Tanneberger

ATB singles chronology
| "9 PM (Till I Come)" (1998) | "Don't Stop!" (1999) | "Killer" (1999) |

Music video
- "ATB - Don't Stop (Official Video HD)" on YouTube

"Don't Stop!" is a song by German DJ ATB with vocals from Yolanda Rivera. It was a number-13 hit in ATB's native Germany and reached number three on the UK Singles Chart. The track was featured on many compilations. In 2000, it appeared on a mix from San Francisco's Mars & Mystre. The UK radio edit was remixed by X-Cabs.

In a Trance.nu interview on 11 May 2007, ATB considered "Don't Stop!" to be his worst production to date, and he no longer stands by it due to it being similar to his first hit, "9 PM (Till I Come)".

== Track listings ==
German release 1

- 01. Don't Stop (Airplay Edit) 3:50
- 02. Don't Stop (SQ-1 Mix) 6:18
- 03. Don't Stop (C.L.U.B.B. Mix) 5:49

German release 2

- 01. Don't Stop! (Airplay Edit) 3:50
- 02. Don't Stop! (Sash! Remix) 5:56

German release 3

- 01. Don't Stop! (Airplay Edit) 3:47
- 02. Don't Stop! (SQ.1 Mix) 6:22
- 03. Don't Stop! (Clubb Mix) 5:53
- 04. Don't Stop! (ATB Remix) 6:47
- 05. Don't Stop! (Spacekid Contact Woody Van Eyden Remix) 5:38
- 06. Don't Stop! (Sash! Remix) 5:59

US release

- 01. Don't Stop! (Airplay Edit) 3:46
- 02. Don't Stop! (X-Cabs Radio Edit) 2:44
- 03. Don't Stop! (SQ-1 Mix) 6:21
- 04. Don't Stop! (C.L.U.B.B. Mix) 5:54
- 05. Don't Stop! (Sash! Remix) 6:01
- 06. Don't Stop! (Spacekid Contacts Woody Van Eyden Remix) 5:41

UK release 1

- 01. Don't Stop (X-Cabs Radio Edit) 2:44
- 02. Don't Stop (Sequential One Edit) 4:38
- 03. 9PM (Till I Come) (Matt Darey Remix) 8:06

UK release 2

- 01. Don't Stop (X-Cabs Radio Edit) 2:44
- 02. Don't Stop (Sequential One Edit) 4:38
- 03. Don't Stop (X-Cabs Remix) 7:16
- 04. Don't Stop (Sequential One Remix) 6:05

Australian release

- 01. Don't Stop (Sequential One Radio Edit) 2:43
- 02. Don't Stop (X-Cabs Radio Edit) 2:41
- 03. Don't Stop (Sequential One Remix) 6:05
- 04. Don't Stop (X-Cabs Remix) 7:16

Canadian release

- 01. Don't Stop (Radio Edit) 3:49
- 02. Don't Stop (SQ-1 Mix) 6:19
- 03. Don't Stop (C.L.U.B.B. Mix) 5:53
- 04. Don't Stop (Sash! Remix) 6:02
- 05. Don't Stop (Spacekid Contacts Woody Van Eyden) 5:39
- 06. Don't Stop (ATB Remix) 6:47
- 07. 9 PM (Till I Come) (Radio Edit) 3:18
- 08. 9 PM (Till I Come) (Club Mix) 5:29
- 09. 9 PM (Till I Come) (Sequential One Remix) 6:11
- 10. 9 PM (Till I Come) (Gary D's Northern Light Remix) 7:28
- 11. 9 PM (Till I Come) (Signum Remix) 7:37
- 12. 9 PM (Till I Come) (Matt Darey Mix) 8:08

== Charts ==
=== Weekly charts ===
Weekly chart performance for "Don't Stop!"
| Chart (1999–2000) | Peak position |
|---|---|
| Australia (ARIA) | 11 |
| Belgium (Ultratop 50 Wallonia) | 28 |
| Canada Dance/Urban (RPM) | 2 |
| Denmark (IFPI) | 8 |
| Europe (Eurochart Hot 100) | 13 |
| Finland (Suomen virallinen lista) | 8 |
| France (SNEP) | 28 |
| Germany (GfK) | 13 |
| Italy (Musica e dischi) | 22 |
| Netherlands (Dutch Top 40) | 17 |
| Netherlands (Single Top 100) | 21 |
| New Zealand (Recorded Music NZ) | 37 |
| Norway (VG-lista) | 8 |
| Scottish Singles Sales (Official Charts) | 2 |
| Spain (Promusicae) | 14 |
| Sweden (Sverigetopplistan) | 20 |
| Switzerland (Schweizer Hitparade) | 49 |
| UK Singles (Official Charts) | 3 |
| US Dance Singles Sales (Billboard) | 16 |

2024–2025 weekly chart performance for "Don't Stop!"
| Chart (2024–2025) | Peak position |
|---|---|
| Czech Republic Airplay (ČNS IFPI) | 24 |
| Poland (Polish Airplay Top 100) | 10 |
| Slovakia Airplay (ČNS IFPI) | 37 |

=== Monthly charts ===
Monthly chart performance for "Don't Stop (I Wanna Know)"
| Chart (2024–2025) | Peak position |
|---|---|
| Czech Republic (Rádio Top 100) | 21 |
| Slovakia (Rádio Top 100) | 44 |

=== Year-end charts ===
1999 year-end chart performance for "Don't Stop!"
| Chart (1999) | Position |
|---|---|
| Europe Border Breakers (Music & Media) | 28 |
| Netherlands (Dutch Top 40) | 141 |
| Romania (Romanian Top 100) | 46 |
| Sweden (Hitlistan) | 100 |
| UK Singles (OCC) | 80 |
| UK Pop (Music Week) | 6 |

2000 year-end chart performance for "Don't Stop!"
| Chart (2000) | Position |
|---|---|
| US Maxi-Singles Sales (Billboard) | 48 |

== Certifications ==
Certifications for "Don't Stop!"
| Region | Certification | Certified units/sales |
|---|---|---|
| Australia (ARIA) | Gold | 35,000^{^} |
| Sweden (GLF) | Platinum | 30,000^{^} |
| United Kingdom (BPI) | Silver | 200,000^{^} |
^{^} Shipments figures based on certification alone.

== Release history ==
Release dates and formats for "Don't Stop!"
| Region | Date | Format(s) | Label(s) | Ref. |
|---|---|---|---|---|
| Germany | 15 March 1999 | CD | Kontor; Motor Music | |
| United Kingdom | 11 October 1999 | 12-inch vinyl; CD; cassette | Sound of Ministry | |
