= The DJ 3 in the Mix =

The DJ in the Mix 3

Compilation album by ATB
- Released: February 17, 2006
- Genre: Trance
- Producer: ATB

ATB chronology
| The DJ 2 in the Mix (2004) | The DJ in the Mix 3 (2006) | The DJ 4 in the Mix (2007) |

Singles from The DJ in the Mix 3
- 1. "Summer Rain" Released: June 2006

The DJ 3 In The Mix is the third DJ mix compilation by German producer and remixer ATB, which was released on February 17, 2006. The DJ 3 is a double-CD album, and includes songs by various DJs and producers, all mixed and compiled by ATB.

== Track listing ==
=== Disc 1 ===
1. ATB - Summer Rain (136 BPM Mix)
2. Giuseppe Ottaviani - Linking People (Original Mix)
3. Above & Beyond vs. Andy Moor - Air for Life (Original Mix)
4. Tiësto - UR (Junkie XL Air Guitar Mix)
5. Luminary - Amsterdam (Smith & Pledger Remix)
6. Darren Tate - Dawn (Original Mix)
7. Markus Schulz and Departure with Gabriel & Dresden - Without Your Near (Gabriel & Dresden Mix)
8. Solarscape - Alive (Alucard Mix)
9. Drax and Scott Mac - Must Have Been a Dream (Original Mix)
10. Mark Norman - Touch Down (Original Mix)
11. Jonas Steur - Silent Waves (Original Mix)
12. Headstrong feat. Tiff Lacey - Close Your Eyes (Dwight Van Mann Remix)
13. Carrie Skipper - Time Goes By (Super 8 Deep Mix)
14. Marksun & Brian - Neno Itome (Original Mix)
15. Lennox - Servant of Justice (Alex M.O.R.P.H. Remix)

=== Disc 2 ===
1. Ronski Speed and Sebastian Sand - Sole Survivor (Sebastian Sand Mix)
2. Hidden Logic pres. Luminary - Wasting (Original Mix)
3. Nalin and Kane - Open Your Eyes (The Child You Are) (Bush II Bush 2005 Remix)
4. Shifted Reality - Fever (DJ3 Mix)
5. Armin van Buuren feat. Nadia Ali - Who is Watching (Mischa Daniels Mix)
6. Cressida - Certainty (Original Mix)
7. ATB - Summer Rain (132 BPM Mix)
8. Mirco de Govia - Vital Spark (Original Mix)
9. Hiver & Hammer - Fusion 2006 (Funabashi Mix)
10. Signalrunners - 3000 Miles Away (Probspot Club Mix)
11. Nile - Ra (Original Mix)
12. Alt + F4 - Alt + F4 (Original Mix)
13. Alucard - Lighthouse (Original Mix)
14. Funabashi - Daylight (Original Mix)
