= Fuldner =

Fuldner is a German language habitational surname. Notable people with the name include:

- Carlos Fuldner (1910–1992), Argentine born Nazi and businessman
- Virginia Ruth Fuldner (1947), American former competition swimmer
