= Distant Earth =

Album by ATB

Studio album by ATB
- Released: April 29, 2011
- Recorded: 2010–2011
- Genre: Trance, dance, chillout
- Label: Kontor Records
- Producer: ATB

ATB chronology
Future Memories (2009)	Distant Earth (2011)	Contact (2014)

Singles from Distant Earth
- 1. "Gold" Released: 29 April 2011; 2. "Apollo Road" Released: 8 July 2011; 3. "Move On" Released: 16 September 2011

Distant Earth is German producer André "ATB" Tanneberger's eighth studio album, which was released on 29 April 2011, by Kontor Records. It features 2 CDs in the standard edition, 3 CDs in the limited edition, and 3 CDs + 5 ATB signed postcards + ATB bracelet in the FanBox Limited Edition (which can be ordered on Amazon and it is limited to 2000 copies). Also, there is another 2 CD digipack version that comes with an ATB sticker and it is available only in Germany.

The first CD is an ATB-standard tracks CD, which contains tracks featuring artists like Josh Gallahan, Amurai, Dash Berlin, Sean Ryan, Rea Garvey, Melissa Loretta or JanSoon. The second CD is an ambient / lounge CD which brings us a surprising collaboration with Armin van Buuren for the track called "Vice Versa", and, finally, the third CD contains the club versions of the tracks found on the first CD.

== Track listing ==
Distant Earth – Standard Edition (Disc 1)
No.	Title	Length
1.	"Twisted Love" (Distant Earth Vocal Version) (feat. Christina Soto)	6:13
2.	"Gold" (feat. JanSoon)	4:16
3.	"All I Need Is You" (feat. Sean Ryan)	4:37
4.	"If It's Love" (feat. Melissa Loretta)	3:25
5.	"Move On" (feat. JanSoon)	5:09
6.	"Chapter One" (with Josh Gallahan)	6:53
7.	"Heartbeat" (with Amurai feat. Melissa Loretta)	6:09
8.	"Killing Me Inside" (feat. Sean Ryan)	5:23
9.	"Apollo Road" (with Dash Berlin)	7:27
10.	"Running A Wrong Way" (with Rea Garvey)	3:22
11.	"Where You Are" (feat. Kate Louise Smith)	4:26
12.	"This Is Your Life" (feat. Fuldner)	4:01
13.	"One More" (feat. Christina Soto)	3:46
14.	"White Letters" (feat. Melissa Loretta)	4:44

"Distant Earth" - The 2 CD edition

Distant Earth – Standard Edition (Disc 2)
No.	Title	Length
1.	"Vice Versa" (ATB and Armin van Buuren)	6:49
2.	"Magnetic Girl"	5:03
3.	"Be Like You" (feat. JanSoon)	3:41
4.	"Moments In Peace"	4:40
5.	"Moving Backwards" (feat. Kate Louise Smith)	4:28
6.	"Distant Earth"	6:54
7.	"Trinity"	4:07
8.	"City Of Hope"	2:46
9.	"Expanded Perception"	6:05
10.	"Sternwanderer" (feat. Anova)	6:01
11.	"Orbit"	4:40

"Distant Earth" - Deluxe fanbox edition

Distant Earth – Limited Edition (Disc 3)
No.	Title	Length
1.	"Twisted Love" (Distant Earth Vocal Club Version) (feat. Cristina Soto)	7:47
2.	"Twisted Love" (Distant Earth Intro Club Version) (feat. Cristina Soto)	7:03
3.	"This Is Your Life" (Club Version) (feat. Fuldner)	6:18
4.	"Move On" (Club Version) (feat. JanSoon)	8:30
5.	"Where You Are" (Club Version) (feat. Kate Louise Smith)	5:57
6.	"All I Need" (Club Version) (feat. Sean Ryan)	6:20
7.	"Heartbeat" (Club Version) (with Amurai feat. Melissa Loretta)	7:22
8.	"Apollo Road" (Club Version) (with Dash Berlin)	8:17
9.	"Chapter One" (Club Version) (with Josh Gallahan)	8:42

== Distant Earth Remixed ==
Distant Earth Remixed

Remix album by ATB
- Released: 16 September 2011
- Recorded: 2011
- Genre: Trance, Dance
- Label: Kontor Records
- Producer: ATB

On 29 July 2011, André announced through his Facebook page that a remixed edition of Distant Earth would be released later that year. The album was released on 16 September 2011. This was the first remix album released by ATB.

=== Track listing ===
Distant Earth Remixed – Disc 1
No.	Title	Length
1.	"Heartbeat" (ATB's Deep From The Heart Remix) (with Amurai feat. Melissa Loretta)	8:48
2.	"Killing Me Inside" (Josh Gallahan Remix) (feat. Sean Ryan)	8:06
3.	"Move On" (Jashari Remix) (feat. JanSoon)	6:47
4.	"One More" (Inpetto Dub Remix) (feat. Cristina Soto)	6:23
5.	"If It's Love" (Jeziel Quintela, Jquintel & Manufactured Superstars Remix) (feat. Melissa Loretta)	8:06
6.	"Twisted Love" (Otto Knows Remix) (feat. Cristina Soto)	6:35
7.	"All I Need Is You" (Fade Remix) (feat. Sean Ryan)	6:48
8.	"Apollo Road" (Patric La Funk Remix) (with Dash Berlin)	6:23
9.	"Heartbeat" (Laserkraft 3D Remix Vocal Edit) (with Amurai feat. Melissa Loretta)	7:00
10.	"White Letters" (DBN Remix) (feat. Melissa Loretta)	7:34

Distant Earth Remixed – Disc 2
No.	Title	Length
1.	"Move On" (ATB Club Version) (feat. JanSoon)	8:26
2.	"Heartbeat" (MYNC Remix) (with Amurai feat. Melissa Loretta)	6:04
3.	"Move On" (Lissat & Voltaxx Remix) (feat. JanSoon)	7:27
4.	"Where You Are" (Mike Foyle Remix) (feat. Kate Louise Smith)	8:29
5.	"One More" (Manuel De La Mare & Luca Monticelli Remix) (feat. Cristina Soto)	7:50
6.	"Where You Are" (Club Version) (feat. Kate Louise Smith)	5:55
7.	"Heartbeat" (Club Version) (with Amurai feat. Melissa Loretta)	7:21
8.	"Chapter One" (Club Version) (with Josh Gallahan)	8:41
9.	"Apollo Road" (Club Version) (with Dash Berlin)	8:16
10.	"Twisted Love" (Distant Earth Vocal Club Version) (feat. Cristina Soto)	7:47

== Charts and certifications ==
=== Charts ===
Chart (2011)	Peak position
Austrian Albums (Ö3 Austria)	37
German Albums (Offizielle Top 100)	7
Polish Albums (ZPAV)	9
Swiss Albums (Schweizer Hitparade)	60
Mexican Albums (Top 100 Mexico)	60
US Top Dance Albums (Billboard)	15
US Heatseekers Albums (Billboard)	30

=== Certifications ===
Region	Certification	Certified units/sales
Poland (ZPAV)	Platinum	20,000^{*}
^{*} Sales figures based on certification alone.
