= Sunset Beach DJ Session =

Compilation album by ATB
- Released: July 2010
- Recorded: 2010
- Genre: Trance, Dance, Chillout
- Length: 156' 17"
- Label: Kontor Records
- Producer: ATB

Singles from Sunset Beach DJ Session
- 1. "Could You Believe" Released: July 2010

Sunset Beach DJ Session is a mix DJ compilation by German producer and remixer ATB, which was released in 2010. It is a double-CD album, and includes songs by various DJs and producers, all mixed and compiled by ATB.

== Track listing ==
CD 1

1. ATB - Could you believe
2. Yuri Kane - Right back
3. Tim Berg - Bromance (Avicii's arena mix)
4. Robert Babicz - Dark flower (Fever mix)
5. George Acosta - Tearing me apart (feat. Fisher) (Gerry Cueto vocal remix)
6. ATB - Touch & Go
7. Tim Berg vs. Oliver Ingrosso & Otto Knows - Loopede
8. LTN - One night in Ibiza
9. ATB - Midnight sun
10. Dash Berlin - Never cry again (Amurai's Los Angeles mix)
11. Nic Chagall - This moment (feat. Jonathan Mendelsohn) (prog mix)
12. Beltek - Eclipse
13. D-Mad - She gave happiness (Arty Remix)
14. Ferry Tayle & Static Blue - Trapeze

CD 2

1. ATB & Josh Gallahan - Co 1724
2. Tiësto - The tube (Domenico Cascarino & Luca Lombardi elektro acoustic mix)
3. Sounds From The Ground - Moving into a new space (feat. Nicola Hitchcock)
4. Asheni - Sweet suffering (DJ Sin Plomo mix)
5. ATB - Remember that day
6. Mylo - Emotion 98.6
7. Edward Shearmur - Taxi ride
8. Late Night Alumni - Empty streets
9. Sans Souci - Puro (sunset mix)
10. Atb - Fahrenheit 451
11. Summer of Space - New found art
12. Lux - Secret fish
13. Schodt - Cinematico
14. Röyksopp - Only this moment
15. Alpha Child - Gamma ray (Franc Spangler remix)
