= Contact (ATB album) =

Studio album by ATB
- Released: January 24, 2014
- Recorded: 2013
- Genre: Trance, dance, chillout
- Label: Kontor Records
- Producer: ATB

ATB chronology
| Distant Earth (2011) | Contact (2014) | neXT (2017) |

Singles from Contact
- 1. "Face to Face" Released: 15 January 2014; 2. "When It Ends It Starts Again" Released: 2 May 2014; 3. "Raging Bull" Released: 4 June 2014

Contact is the ninth studio album by German DJ André "ATB" Tanneberger, It was released on 24 January 2014 through Kontor Records.

== Release ==
Like the previous album, Distant Earth, Contact was released in three varieties: standard 2 CD version, 3-CD Box Set and a Deluxe Fan Box (which was limited to 2000 copies and sold via Amazon).

The album standard edition contains 2 CDs. The first CD contains standard ATB tracks, and features collaborations with artists like Jes, York, JanSoon, Stanfour, Tiff Lacey and Sean Ryan. The second CD is an ambient-chillout disc, and contains tracks in collaboration with Anova, Stefan Erbe or Fade. In Japan, however, the release presents only the first CD.

The third disc, available in the Box Set, contains remixes of tracks found on the first CD, two tracks from ATB in Concert Live in New York, and an exclusive behind-the-scenes video from ATB's American tour. The limited edition Fan Box contains all three discs, 5 ATB postcards (one of which is handsigned by the DJ himself), an ATB sticker and an ATB flag.

== Track listing ==
Contact – Standard Edition (CD 1) / Japan Edition
| No. | Title | Length |
|---|---|---|
| 1. | "When It Ends It Starts Again" (feat. Sean Ryan) | 4:51 |
| 2. | "Raging Bull" (with Boss & Swan) | 3:37 |
| 3. | "Together" (ATB and Jes Brieden) | 4:42 |
| 4. | "Face To Face" (feat. Stanfour) | 3:41 |
| 5. | "Beam Me Up" (feat. Boss & Swan) | 4:32 |
| 6. | "Hard To Cure" (ATB and Jes Brieden) | 6:05 |
| 7. | "Now Or Never" (feat. JanSoon) | 4:36 |
| 8. | "Straight To The Stars" (feat. Sean Ryan) | 4:21 |
| 9. | "Walking Awake" (with Boss & Swan) | 5:09 |
| 10. | "Everything Is Beautiful" (ATB and Taylr Renee) | 5:01 |
| 11. | "What Are You Waiting For" (feat. JanSoon) | 4:11 |
| 12. | "Still Here" (ATB's Anthem 2014 Version) (feat. Tiff Lacey) | 5:44 |
| 13. | "Arms Wide Open" (feat. Vanessa Ekpenyong) | 4:08 |
| 14. | "Right Back To You" (ATB and York feat. Jes Brieden) | 4:47 |

Contact – Standard Edition (CD 2)
| No. | Title | Length |
|---|---|---|
| 1. | "Contact" | 5:32 |
| 2. | "Trace Of Life" | 6:28 |
| 3. | "When Angels Travel" (Feat. Stefan Erbe) | 7:25 |
| 4. | "Jetstream" (feat. Anova) | 4:25 |
| 5. | "Supersonic" | 7:23 |
| 6. | "Pacific Avenue" (feat. Fade) | 6:56 |
| 7. | "Red Sun" | 7:51 |
| 8. | "The Mission" | 6:51 |
| 9. | "Love The Silence" | 5:47 |
| 10. | "Cursed By Beauty" | 6:16 |
| 11. | "Galaxia" | 7:04 |
| 12. | "Breathe" (feat. Anova) | 2:50 |

Contact – Limited Enhanced Edition (CD 3)
| No. | Title | Writer(s) | Length |
|---|---|---|---|
| 1. | "Now Or Never" (Junkx Remix) (feat. JanSoon) | | 5:48 |
| 2. | "Raging Bull" (Junkx Remix) (with Boss & Swan) | | 5:38 |
| 3. | "Face To Face" (Feat. Stefan Erbe) | Rudee Remix) (feat. Stanfour | 6:51 |
| 4. | "When It Ends It Starts Again" (Original Instrumental Version) (feat. Sean Ryan) | | 4:50 |
| 5. | "Face To Face" (ATB In Concert Live In New York) (feat. Stanfour) | | 6:14 |
| 6. | "Hard To Cure" (ATB ln Concert Live In New York) (feat. Jes Brieden) | | 6:35 |
| 7. | "ATB ln Concert" (Exclusive Behind The Scenes ATB US Tour) (video) | | 7:51 |

== Charts ==
| Chart (2014) | Peak position |
|---|---|
| Austrian Albums (Ö3 Austria) | 29 |
| Czech Albums (ČNS IFPI) | 15 |
| German Albums (Offizielle Top 100) | 5 |
| Dutch Albums (Album Top 100) | 44 |
| Hungarian Albums (MAHASZ) | 11 |
| Polish Albums (ZPAV) | 2 |
| Swiss Albums (Schweizer Hitparade) | 44 |

== Certifications ==
| Region | Certification | Certified units/sales |
|---|---|---|
| Poland (ZPAV) | Gold | 10,000^{‡} |
^{‡} Sales+streaming figures based on certification alone.
