= Filo & Peri =

American DJ and EDM producer duo

- Also known as: Empire State, FnP, Madison Factor, Taxi, Whirlpool
- Born: Dominic Filopei & Bo Pericic
- Origin: New York, USA
- Occupation(s): DJs, Producers, Remixers
- Instrument(s): Synthesizer, Drum Machine
- Years active: 2003-2013
- Labels: VANDIT Records, VANDIT Digital, Armada Music, Positiva Records, Baroque Records, Subliminal Records, Primal, ESR
- Website: Official Website

Filo & Peri (/ˈfiːloʊ ... ˈpɛri/ FEE-loh, PERR-ee) were an American DJ EDM duo consisting of producers Domenick Filopei and Bo Pericic.

== Career ==
Filo & Peri were discovered and signed by Armin van Buuren to his Armada record label. They ranked in the DJ Mag Top 100 in 2006 and 2007.

Filo & Peri have held the number one spot on the Billboard dance chart with their hit single "Anthem", as well as an entry into the UK National Top 40.

Their debut artist album Nightplay hit shelves in November 2009 on Vandit Records.

== Discography ==
More complete information can be found on Filo and Peri's Discogs page.

=== Albums ===
- Filo & Peri - Nightplay (VANDIT - 2009)

=== Singles ===
- Filo & Peri - "Elevation" (Universal Religion Chapter 1 - 2003)
- Filo & Peri feat. Fisher - "Closer Now" (VANDIT - 2006)
- Filo & Peri feat. Fisher - "Ordinary Moment" (VANDIT - 2006)
- Filo & Peri feat. Lorraine - "Heaven" (2006 Waterfall Records Limited)
- Filo & Peri - "Giddy Up" (Reno 911!: Miami movie soundtrack 2006)
- Filo & Peri feat. Tiff Lacey - "Dance with a Devil" (Pulsive Media - 2006)
- Filo & Peri - "Long Train Running" (Subliminal - 2006)
- Filo & Peri feat. Lorraine - "Heaven" (2006 Waterfall Records Limited)
- Filo & Peri - "Giddy Up" (Reno 911!: Miami movie soundtrack 2006)
- Filo & Peri feat. Tiff Lacey - "Dance with a Devil" (Pulsive Media - 2006)
- Filo & Peri feat. Marne Massa & Darren Barley - "Secret Harmony"(2007)
- Filo & Peri - "Pocket Pimps" (2007)
- Filo & Peri - "Wet Groovin" (Wet Grooves Theme Song - 2007)
- Filo & Peri feat. Marne Massa & Darren Barley - "Secret Harmony"(2007)
- Filo & Peri feat. Eric Lumiere - "Anthem" (VANDIT - 2007)
- Filo & Peri - "Pocket Pimps" (2007)
- Filo & Peri vs. Nucvise - "Jiggle It" (2007)
- Filo & Peri vs. Serge Devant - "Electric Funk" (2007)
- Filo & Peri - "Wet Groovin" (Wet Grooves Theme Song - 2007)
- Filo & Peri feat. Vanessa Valentin - "Inside of Me" (2007 remix)
- Filo & Peri feat. Chris Villari - "Come Together" (2007)
- Deepsky feat. JES - "Ghost" (Filo & Peri Remix)
- Marco V - "Dudak" (Filo & Peri Remix)
- Serge Devant - "Part of Me" (Filo & Peri Remix) (Payday Records 2007)
- Cosmic Gate feat. Denise Rivera vs. Nenes - "Body of Conflict" (Filo & Peri Mashup)
- Filo & Peri - "Butta Space" (Gatecrasher - 2008)
- FnP Project - "Buzzed Up" (Big Room Music - 2008)
- Filo & Peri - "Butta Space" (Gatecrasher - 2008)
- Filo & Peri feat. Eric Lumiere - "Shine On" (VANDIT - 2008)
- Filo & Peri - "Ashley" (feat. Aruna) (VANDIT - 2009)
- Filo & Peri - "Drops of Jupiter" (VANDIT - 2009)
- Filo & Peri - "Drops of Jupiter: The Remixes" (VANDIT - 2009)
- Filo & Peri - "VANDIT - The Digital Sessions Ibiza 2009 Mixed by Filo & Peri" (VANDIT - 2009)
- Filo & Peri feat. Audrey Gallagher - "This Night" (2010)
- Filo & Peri - "What You Came Here For" (2012)
