= The DJ 4 in the Mix =

Compilation album by ATB
- Released: December 2007
- Recorded: 2007
- Genre: Trance
- Producer: ATB

ATB chronology
The DJ 3 in the Mix (2006)	The DJ 4 in the Mix (2007)	The DJ 5 in the Mix (2010)

The DJ 4 In The Mix is the fourth DJ mix compilation by German producer and remixer ATB, which was released on December 28, 2007. Like his last three mix compilations, The DJ 4 is a double-CD album, and includes songs by various DJs and producers, all mixed and compiled by ATB.

ATB has collaborated with many important artists for this release, including French electronic composer and worldwide artist Jean Michel Jarre. The song "Vintage" from his 2007 studio album Téo & Téa is featured on this mix compilation, under the name ATB Remix.

== Track listing ==
=== Disc 1 ===
1. ATB - Justify (New World Mix)
2. Jean Michel Jarre - Vintage (ATB Remix)
3. Josh Gallahan - 1st. Strike (Original Mix)
4. Lange - Angel Falls (Langes Firewall Mix)
5. Mark Norman - Ventura (ATB Remix)
6. Breakfast - The Horizon (Original Mix)
7. Oliver Smith - Nimbus (Original Mix)
8. Ronski Speed - Love All The Pain Away (Kyau & Albert Remix)
9. Mandala Bros. - Sleep Walking (Duderstadt Uplifting Mix)
10. Alexander Popov - Vapour Trails (Original Mix)
11. Alex Bartlett feat. Anthya — Touch The Sun (Duende Vocal Rmx)
12. Super 8 & Tab - Suru (Original Mix)
13. Taylor and Gallahan - Resistance (Original Mix)
14. ATB - Nightwatch (Original Mix)

=== Disc 2 ===
1. Breakfast - Dancing In The Moonlight (Original Mix)
2. Cosmic Gate feat. Denise Rivera - Body Of Conflict (Extended Vocal Mix)
3. ATB - Desperate Religion (Cunningham Remix)
4. Deadmau5 - Not Exactly (Original Mix)
5. Arabella - Nabucco (Midor Remix)
6. ATB - Justify (Adam Nickey Remix)
7. Jose Amnesia feat. Jennifer Rene - Wouldn't Change A Thing (Retrobyte Club Edit)
8. Andrew Bennett - Safe From Harm (Simon And Shaker Remix)
9. Glenn Morrison - No Sudden Moves (Original Mix)
10. Adam Nickey - Never Gone (Above And Beyond Mix)
11. Van Der Vleuten - Broken Dreams (Original Mix)
12. Sied van Riel - Sigh (Original Mix)
13. Glenn Morrison - Circles (Original Mix)

== Charts ==
Chart performance for The DJ 4 in the Mix
Chart (2007)	Peak position
Polish Albums (ZPAV)	19
