= Next (ATB album) =

Studio album by ATB
- Released: April 21, 2017
- Recorded: 2015–2017
- Label: Kontor, Armada Music
- Producer: ATB

ATB chronology
Contact (2014)	Next (2017)

Singles from Next
- 1. "Flash X" Released: October 14, 2015; 2. "Connected" Released: February 23, 2017; 3. "Message Out to You" Released: April 7, 2017; 4. "Pages" Released: June 16, 2017; 5. "Never Without You" Released: September 22, 2017

Next, stylized as neXt, is German producer André "ATB" Tanneberger's tenth studio album, released on April 21, 2017, by Kontor Records.

== Description ==
It features two CDs, released in digipak format in Europe, where it was also released as a deluxe limited edition box set, that comes with a scarf, which reads ATB Family; as a limited 2-LP edition; and as a limited edition, which comes in PVC sleeve, and presentes the first disc in vinyl format and the second one in CD.

The artist announced the release of the album on February 10, 2017, on his Facebook page, stating:

"Hey ATB family. Finally the wait is over. I’m really happy to announce that my new album “neXt” will be out on April 21st 2017!!!
Pre-order my album on CD and vinyl on amazon now! Online version will follow :) Wishing you guys a great weekend.
Andre :)"

== Track listing ==
neXt – Disc 1
No.	Title	Length
1.	"Pages" (featuring Haliene)	3:43
2.	"Never Without You" (featuring Sean Ryan)	5:36
3.	"If It Takes All Night" (featuring Cavale)	3:28
4.	"Stay with Me" (featuring Mike Schmid)	3:19
5.	"Message Out to You" (with F51 featuring Robbin & Jonnis)	3:36
6.	"A Place Like You" (featuring Mister Blonde)	3:24
7.	"Connected" (ATB and Andrew Rayel)	4:12
8.	"Remember When" (featuring Lenachka)	3:31
9.	"Breach" (ATB and Myon featuring Ethan Thompson -written by Ben Samama, Ethan Thompson and David Veslocki)	3:44
10.	"Close Enough to Touch" (ATB vs. Alyx Ander featuring Maria Z)	3:42
11.	"I'm Here" (featuring Jan Loechel)	4:02
12.	"Heart of Stone" (featuring Mike Schmid)	3:45
13.	"Flash X" (featuring Mike Schmid)	3:21

neXt – Disc 2
No.	Title	Length
1.	"Route 66" (ATB and Anova)	5:10
2.	"Faith" (featuring Tilsen)	3:56
3.	"Green Sand"	5:06
4.	"Moving Cloudbreak" (featuring Fade)	5:40
5.	"When It Ends It Starts Again" (ambient version) (ATB and Sean Ryan)	5:37
6.	"Back Home"	3:19
7.	"Restart"	3:17
8.	"Never Stop"	3:49
9.	"Time"	4:28
10.	"Pulsar"	6:51
11.	"Within a Dream"	4:52
12.	"Project X"	4:10

== Charts ==
Chart (2017)	Peak position
Austrian Albums (Ö3 Austria)	42
Belgian Albums (Ultratop Wallonia)	184
Czech Albums (ČNS IFPI)	53
German Albums (Offizielle Top 100)	14
Polish Albums (ZPAV)	14
Slovak Albums (ČNS IFPI)	38
Swiss Albums (Schweizer Hitparade)	55
US Heatseekers Albums (Billboard)	23
