= Movin' Melodies =

Studio album by ATB
- Released: 26 April 1999
- Recorded: 1998–1999
- Label: Kontor (Germany); Radikal (U.S.)
- Producer: ATB

ATB chronology
Movin' Melodies (1999)	Two Worlds (2000)

Singles from Movin' Melodies
- 1. "9 PM (Till I Come)" Released: 26 October 1998; 2. "Don't Stop!" Released: 15 March 1999; 3. "Killer" Released: 31 May 1999

Professional ratings
Review scores
Source	Rating
AllMusic	2.5/5 stars

Movin' Melodies is German DJ and producer André Tanneberger's debut studio album under the stage name of ATB. It was released in 1999 and includes the singles "9 PM (Till I Come)", "Don't Stop!" and "Killer". The album was written, produced, arranged and engineered by ATB.

Unlike the singles, the typical ATB-sound is hardly used on the album's other tracks. Tanneberger did not want to put together a pure dance album. Therefore, in addition to more club-oriented songs, there are also quiet, melodic tracks that reflect his preference for sound compositions by Enigma, Mike Oldfield and Jean Michel Jarre. Track 12 ("Beach Vibes") is commonly misnamed as "Ocean Trance".

On Spotify, tracks 7 and 12 are omitted from the track listing.

== Background ==
Movin' Melodies began as a record label founded by Dutch producer Patrick Prins in 1992. It quickly gained recognition as one of the pioneers of the handbag/hardbag sound. Following its inception, Patrick Prins collaborated with various producers, including ATB. Notably, ATB adopted the Movin' Melodies name for his debut studio album.

== Track listing ==
Movin' Melodies – standard edition
No.	Title	Length
1.	"The First Tones"	2:09
2.	"Emotion"	4:24
3.	"Underwater World"	4:11
4.	"Zwischenstück"	0:58
5.	"9 PM (Till I Come)" (featuring Yolanda Rivera)	3:14
6.	"Killer 2000" (featuring Drue Williams)	5:56
7.	"Too Much Rain" ((ATB vs. Woody van Eyden Mix) (United Deejays For Central America)	5:36
8.	"Don't Stop!" (featuring Yolanda Rivera)	3:42
9.	"Obsession"	6:25
10.	"My Dream"	7:06
11.	"Kayama"	4:26
12.	"Beach Vibes" (E.F.F.)	8:26
13.	"Movin' Melodies"	6:01
14.	"Sunburn"	3:51

Bonus track
No.	Title	Length
15.	"9 PM (Till I Come)" (Signum Mix) (feat. Yolanda Rivera)	7:36

Movin' Melodies – Portuguese edition (CD 2)
No.	Title	Length
1.	"Sun Is Shining" (ATB Club Mix) (Bob Marley)	3:51
2.	"Don't Stop!" (SQ-1 Mix) (feat. Yolanda Rivera)	6:19
3.	"Sax'y '99" (ATB Remix)	5:46
4.	"Can You Feel..." (SQ-1)	3:19
5.	"Killer" (Video Edit) (feat. Drue Williams)	4:16
6.	"Colour The World" (ATB Remix) (Sash!)	5:51
7.	"It's A Fine Day" (ATB Club By Radio Mix) (Miss Jane)	4:26
8.	"9PM (Till I Come)" (Sequential One 1999 Remix) (feat. Yolanda Rivera)	6:24
9.	"Cream" (ATB Mix) (Piet Blank & Jaspa Jones)	6:10
10.	"Get Ready" (Woody van Eyden feat. Grace)	3:32
11.	"Too Much Rain" (ATB Round Edit) (United Deejays For Central America))	3:18
12.	"Don't Stop!" (ATB Remix)	6:45

Movin' Melodies – UK enhanced CD edition 1 / limited edition
No.	Title	Length
1.	"The First Tones"	2:09
2.	"Emotion"	4:24
3.	"Underwater World"	4:11
4.	"Zwischenstück"	0:58
5.	"9 PM (Till I Come)" (UK Edit) (feat. Yolanda Rivera)	2:39
6.	"Killer 2000" (UK Edit) (feat. Drue Williams)	5:33
7.	"Don't Stop!" (UK Edit) (feat. Yolanda Rivera)	2:40
8.	"Obsession"	6:18
9.	"My Dream"	7:01
10.	"Kayama"	4:25
11.	"Beach Vibes" (E.F.F.)	8:25
12.	"Movin' Melodies" (E.F.F.)	5:56
13.	"Sunburn"	3:51
14.	"9PM (Till I Come)" (Matt Darey Remix) (feat. Yolanda Rivera)	8:06

Movin' Melodies – UK enhanced CD edition 1 (bonus interactive CD)
No.	Title	Length
1.	"9PM (Till I Come)" (video)
2.	"Don't Stop!" (video)
3.	"Don't Stop!" (Quake Remake) (feat. Yolanda Rivera)	8:20
4.	"9PM (Till I Come)" (Bent Remix) (feat. Yolanda Rivera)	7:51
5.	"9PM (Till I Come)" (Nick Muir's Come Mix) (feat. Yolanda Rivera)	7:26
6.	"Biography and photos"
7.	"Free screensaver"
8.	"VIP website access"

Movin' Melodies – UK enhanced CD limited edition (bonus interactive CD)
No.	Title	Length
1.	"9PM (Till I Come)" (video)
2.	"Don't Stop!" (video)
3.	"9PM (Till I Come)" (Matt Darey Remix) (feat. Yolanda Rivera)	8:06
4.	"9PM (Till I Come)" (Nick Muir's Come Mix) (feat. Yolanda Rivera)	7:26
5.	"9PM (Till I Come)" (Bent Remix) (feat. Yolanda Rivera)	7:51
6.	"Don't Stop!" (Quake Remake) (feat. Yolanda Rivera)	8:20
7.	"Don't Stop!" (Sash! Remix) (feat. Yolanda Rivera)	6:33
8.	"Biography and photos"
9.	"Free screensaver"
10.	"VIP website access"

Movin' Melodies – UK enhanced CD edition 2
No.	Title	Length
1.	"The First Tones"	2:09
2.	"Emotion"	4:24
3.	"Underwater World"	4:11
4.	"Zwischenstück"	0:58
5.	"9 PM (Till I Come)" (UK Edit) (feat. Yolanda Rivera)	2:39
6.	"Killer 2000" (UK Edit) (feat. Drue Williams)	5:33
7.	"Don't Stop!" (UK Edit) (feat. Yolanda Rivera)	2:40
8.	"Obsession"	6:18
9.	"My Dream"	7:01
10.	"Kayama"	4:25
11.	"Beach Vibes" (E.F.F.)	8:25
12.	"Movin' Melodies" (E.F.F.)	5:56
13.	"Sunburn"	3:51
14.	"Don't Stop!" (Sash! Remix) (feat. Yolanda Rivera)	5:57

Movin' Melodies – UK enhanced CD edition 2 (bonus interactive CD)
No.	Title	Length
1.	"Killer" (Lost Witness Dub) (feat. Drue Williams)	7:46
2.	"Don't Stop!" (Quake Remake) (feat. Yolanda Rivera)	8:19
3.	"9PM (Till I Come)" (Matt Darey Remix) (feat. Yolanda Rivera)	8:07
4.	"9PM (Till I Come)" (video)
5.	"Don't Stop!" (video)
6.	"Biography and photos"
7.	"Free screensaver"
8.	"VIP website access"

== Charts and certifications ==
=== Charts ===
Chart (1999)	Peak position
German Albums (Offizielle Top 100)	39
Dutch Albums (Album Top 100)	40
Swedish Albums (Sverigetopplistan)	11
Finnish Albums (Suomen virallinen lista)	11
Hungarian Albums (MAHASZ)	7
Portuguese Albums (AFP)	15
Norwegian Albums (VG-lista)	14
Scottish Albums (OCC)	31
UK Albums (OCC)	32

=== Certifications ===
Region	Certification	Certified units/sales
United Kingdom (BPI)	Silver	60,000^{^}
^{^} Shipments figures based on certification alone.
