= Tiff Lacey =

- Born: Tiffany Lacey; 29 October 1965 (age 60)
- Origin: Crayford, London, England
- Genres: Trance; house; electronic; trip hop
- Occupations: Singer, songwriter, writer, artist
- Years active: 1981–present
- Labels: Black Hole Recordings, Loverush Digital
- Website: www.tifflacey.me.uk

Tiffany "Tiff" Lacey (born 29 October 1965) /ˈleɪsi/ is an English trance and electronic dance music (EDM) vocal singer, songwriter, author, and painter. She is the vocalist on several electronic music singles. Best known for her international singles with German producer André Tanneberger (a.k.a. ATB) and for her work with British producer Don Jackson (a.k.a. Headstrong), Matt Darey, and Cosmic Gate. Lacey is the performer with the highest number of officially released collaborations within the EDM genres so far.

== Singing career ==
=== Early work ===
Lacey started singing when she was 16 years old. A few years later, she began working as a backing singer for the band "Falling Man". They recorded an album and gigged regularly until they eventually disbanded. Then she started fronting a blues/rock band touring locally in the South East. However, she felt the need to develop her songwriting capabilities in her own right, so she left the band, but yet teamed up with one of its members. They recorded several songs and had interest from both Virgin and EMI, but broke up soon after. Lacey joined "Frankenstein's Baby", an indie/folk band. They recorded several songs, and performed regularly at the "Mean Fiddler".

=== Career as an electronic music guest vocalist ===
After sending a demo, she was chosen among many by English DJ Paul Oakenfold to record the vocals for his song "Hypnotised", which was included on his 2002 album "Bunkka", and with the single release the next year. It became an international club and radio hit, reaching No. 17 on the Finland Singles Chart and No. 41 on Billboard Hot Dance Club Songs chart in the United States. It was then followed by another dance music collaboration, the single "In Your Hands" with Chris Dececio (a.k.a. Redd Square). In 2003, Lacey performed live with The Thrillseekers and also provided vocals for their single "Affinity". In 2004, when she was included on four tracks from ATB's album No Silence, including "Marrakech" (which was featured on the soundtrack of Renny Harlin's movie "Mindhunters"), charted No. 2 in Hungary, No. 14 in Finland, No. 38 in Germany and No. 50 in Austria. Her single "Ecstasy" featured in the Keenen Ivory Wayans comedy film White Chicks, and charted at No. 11 in the UK, No. 1 in Bulgaria, No. 2 in Hungary, No. 43 in Germany, and No. 62 in Austria. Lacey later worked with ATB again for the albums Seven Years: 1998-2005 (2005) and Future Memories (2009).

In 2005, she recorded vocals for Filo & Peri's techno single "Dance with a Devil", which was remixed by Serge Devant and DJ Shog. She and Headstrong (a.k.a. Don Jackson) recorded singles including "Close Your Eyes" (2005), "Show Me The Love" (2006), "The Truth", and "Symphony Of Soul" (2007). Lacey got in touch with Jackson via another collaborator, Matt Darey (who contributed a remix for "Close Your Eyes"), with whom she recorded the track "Always" in 2006, which was followed by "Sum Of All Fears" (2007) and "Into The Blue" (2010). In 2005, her first collaboration with Lost Witness, called "Home", was voted Future Favorite on Armin van Buuren's A State of Trance No. 322 show. She later worked again with Lost Witness on the singles "Love Again" and "Coming Down".

In 2006, Lacey collaborated for the first time with Cosmic Gate. Their first track, called "Should've Known", was included on the duo's album Earth Mover and was also released as a single with remixes from Wippenberg, Jonas Steur, and DJ Delicious. Wippenberg wanted Lacey for the track "Promisedland" the next year, which was remixed by Nic Chagall.

In 2007, Lacey and Russian DJ Bobina recorded the track "Where Did You Go", which was included on his album "Again". The track was remixed by Dutch DJ Sander van Dien (a.k.a. First State). This was followed by a collaboration between van Dien and Lacey called "Where Do We Go", included on his album "Time Frame". 2007 also marked the singer's first collaboration with Tom Cloud – the track "Secretly", which was released on the A State Of Trance label.

In 2008, she recorded two tracks with the trance duo Matt Abbott and Chris Chambers (a.k.a. Abbott & Chambers) titled "Where Are You" and "Strange Liaison". The tracks were released with remixes by Nitrous Oxide, Cressida, Carl B, Dennis Sheperd, David & Carr, Onova, Allan O' Marshall, and Karl G. These were in the Uplifting trance genre, after being included mainly on Progressive trance and Dance before that. The same year she also did "Don't Be Afraid" with Michael Badal and "The Sweetest Sound" with Nick Murray. Overall in 2008, Lacey was included on more than 30 original releases.

Her collaboration track with Tenishia called "Burning From The Inside" won the award Best Dance Production 2008 at the Malta Music Awards.

She recorded a vocal electronic album with Huw Williams in 2007 and it was released in 2008 under their alias name Rubikon and titled "Wonderland". The album featured 11 original recordings. Three of them, "Thing Called Love", "Why Keep On" and "Telephone" were released as singles with remixes by Morgan Page and Hakan Ludvigson.

Her house music collaborations include: "Clockworks" with Amex, Natlife and Purepath (2008), "Dreaming" with DJ Zya (2009), "Sweet 17" with Tash (2009), "Beds" with Chus Liberata (2010), and "As We Ride" with The Henchmen (2011).

Lacey's first solo single (she only had one solo song included on Ibiza compilation before that) was a piano ballad called "Show Me The Way" was released on 14 December 2009, with a remix package provided by Ivan Spell and Gabriel Lukosz.

In January 2010, "I Know" with George Acosta was released. The remix of the tune by Beat Service was played on A State Of Trance.

In April 2010, Lacey signed with label Loverush Digital for the release of her solo album. Later in that year she did a special appearance on Matt Darey's Nocturnal radio show where a one-hour guest vocal set consisting of her singles was played, including comments by Lacey between each track.

=== 2011 – 2013: "¡Viva!" and further EDM impact ===
In February 2011, her track with Aly & Fila called "Paradise" was released as a single on Future Sound of Egypt, which was played on ASOT.

On 31 January 2011, the singer shared the official video of the first single from her upcoming full-length studio album ¡Viva! called "Take Me Away" on her Facebook page. Later on the same day Mark "Loverush" Schneider announced the single's upcoming release. It was released on 9 March 2011 on iTunes with remixes by Tom Noize, Loverush UK, Darren Flinders, and Stereojackers.

On 8 May 2011, Lacey presented on Facebook an official video to another song from her upcoming album – the ballad "Mother To Daughter". The video was shot in Dorset and in her home. Her daughter also appears in it.

An album launch party was held in London on 12 August 2011, with live performances by Lacey and Paul Stevens, and guest DJ sets by Loverush UK, Stuart J, and Matt Emulsion.

Her album "¡Viva!" came out on iTunes on 15 August 2011 via Loverush Digital. Among the main record producers in it are George Popa, Matt Bukovski, Nick Murray, and Loverush UK!. On the very next day, on 16 August, American DJ/producer Ryan Farish released his album "Upon a Dream" which included three collaborations with Lacey (the title track being one of them).

In January 2012, Lacey's collaboration with Italian DJ Vito De Santis (a.k.a. Vitodito) called "Forbidden Love" was released on Neuroscience Deep. The Domenico Cascarino & Luca Lombardi remix of the track reached No. 3 on Beatport Chillout Chart.

In 2012, she released House genre singles including "Darkest Hours" with Fergus Keogh, "Perfect World" with Pagano (which was a Beatport Progressive House TOP 20 hit), "Dancing into Day" with The Henchmen & Ivan Project and "Heart in Blazing Light" with Philip Aelis, as well as the Trance releases "Sweet Child" with Bartlett Bros and Matt Loki (Beatport Trance #33), "Ugly Truth" with Robert Lyttle (Beatport Trance #45), and "One Day" with Mark Khoen.

In July 2012, her single "Moon in the Dark" with Sean Bay was included in the first official compilation release of internet vocal fans and reviewers group Pure Bliss Vocals. In August, she was voted No. 19 in the Beatsmedia UK's TOP 50 Vocalists of 2012.

She wrote and sang Alex M.O.R.P.H. & Woody van Eyden's track "I See You", included on M.O.R.P.H.'s album "Prime Mover", and Matt Darey & Aeron Aether's "Into The Blue", included on Darey's album "Blossom and Decay", both released on Armada on 13 July – 3 August 2012, respectively. Lacey also collaborated with Laurent Véronnez (a.k.a. Airwave) and their track "Slipping" was included on his album "Bright Lines", released on 29 October 2012.

In 2013, her track "Is This Love" (Beatport Trance #65), with producer Edvard Viber, received support from Pedro Del Mar, Sean Tyas, Giuseppe Ottaviani, and Faruk Sabanci. The single was released on Black Hole Recordings' imprint in Trance We Trust, including four different mixes by Viber, a Maor Levi remix and three radio edits. Further singles included "For Your Love" with Emvy (Trackitdown #6), "Feel Me" with Zaxx (Beatport Trance No. 73, Trackitdown #27) and "Possibility" with Peter Hulsmans. Pedro Del Mar included a dark chillout Lacey song with Maxim Eller called "Wait 4 Her" on his compilation "Playa Del Lounge 4", released 1 July 2013 on Black Hole Recordings. The same was released as a separate single in November on Roger Shah's Shah-Music Digital label.

On 14 June 2013, LAD Publishing & Records released "Push Me Pull Me", which Lacey wrote with Chocolate Zombie and Mr.Rob. The lyrics of the track are freely based on Charlotte Brontë's bestseller Jane Eyre. The singer watched the 2011 film rendition of the book, directed by Cary Fukunaga, before writing the lyrics for that track, and included the words "You said you had a feeling about me, as if you had a string under your rib" in the recording studio. The song lyrics are an imaginary Jane Eyre answer to her love Mr. Rochefort.

On 8 July 2013, "I See You" with Alex M.O.R.P.H. and Woody van Eyden was officially released as a single on Armada Music's imprint A State Of Trance, with the release including a Matt Bukovski remix. The last peaked at No. 13 on Beatport Trance Top 100 while the original mix made it to No. 21.

On 3 December 2013, Lacey was featured on Ryan Farish's album "Destiny", which includes their track "Identical Skin" – Lacey's first official song in the Dubstep genre.

=== 2014–present: More EDM ===
In 2014, she released her second single with Polish producer Paul Dave, called "Barefoot In The Dark", which was released in January on the Polish My Music Group label. In February the album "Inside Me" was released. It includes nine tracks produced by Greek DJ Vierro with five of them featuring lyrics and vocals by Lacey. One of the tracks, "Honesty", is a duet with fellow singer Cari Golden. In March, "Tears In Rain" with Simon Pitt was released, in a remixed version by ReOrder, on Fraction Records. The single saw Lacey returning to the uplifting trance genre. It was supported by Armin van Buuren on his A State Of Trance show and peaked at #32 on the Beatport Trance Top 100 chart. Further singles of the singer included "A Thousand Pieces" with Iranian producer Farhad Mahdavi on Abora Recordings, "Endless Sleep" with Maltese Clayton Coleiro a.k.a. Clay C and "Epiphany" – a collaboration with Koishii & Hush, all released in the month of May.

On 13 April 2014, Lacey released a single with NoMosk, called "The Promise". The Denis Kenzo remix of the same was played by Armin van Buuren as the opening track on his ASOT No. 705 show. Later in the same month, Michael Badal's album "Now That We're Human" was released on Black Hole Recordings, featuring the track "Fairy Tale" with the singer – a follow-up to "Don't Be Afraid", released 8 years prior.

In 2016, the singer collaborated with producer Alex Kunnari on the track "In The Deep", released on Black Hole Recordings' sub-label Magik Musik.

After the successful "I See You", released in 2013, Alex M.O.R.P.H. and Woody van Eyden reunited with Lacey in 2016 for the track "Dreamcatcher", included on M.O.R.P.H.'s album "Not All Superheroes Wear Capes".

== Other activities ==
Lacey writes most of her own song lyrics. Her themes include various subjects, like fantasy, spirituality, introspection, summer and, in a particular way, motherhood. She always writes complete lyrics for a song, it is up to the DJs in the EDM cases on whether the whole lyrical content will be included in the final track or not. Lacey released her first book, The Songwriter's Guide to the Galaxy, in July 2014. She then released a children's book, in collaboration with her daughter, titled The Nine Legged Octopus.

Lacey is also a painter and photographer and maintains a website called FaithHope&Love, with her artistic pieces and photographs. Since late 2012, Lacey also launching her own record label, FireFlower Music, where she will be releasing her own experimental music material, as well as upcoming EDM solo singles of hers and other artists.

=== Books ===
- The Songwriter's Guide to the Galaxy (2014), PeaChi Publishing
- The Nine Legged Octopus (2015), PeaChi Publishing (as Tiff Cook)

== Discography ==
=== Albums ===
- Wonderland (as Rubikon) (2008)
- ¡Viva! (2011)
- Songs Under Moonlight (with Zetandel) (2020)

=== Recurring collaborations ===
- ATB & Tiff Lacey – Ecstasy, Here With Me, Marrakech (2004); Humanity (2005); My Everything, Still Here, Missing (2009)
- Flash Brothers & Tiff Lacey - Faith in Love (2005), Stay (2007), Heaven's Gate (2011)
- Headstrong & Tiff Lacey – Close Your Eyes (2005), Silver Shadow, Show Me the Love (2006); Symphony of Soul, The Truth (2007); Love of Fools, Crimson Sky (2010)
- Lost Witness & Tiff Lacey – Home, Love Again (2005); Coming Down (2007)
- Cosmic Gate & Tiff Lacey – Should've Known (2006), Open Your Heart (2009)
- Matt Darey & Tiff Lacey – Always (2006), Sum of all Fears (2007), Into the Blue (2010)
- Marco Torrance & Tiff Lacey - Free of Fear (2008), Dancing Brave (2010), Playing God (2012)
- Abbott & Chambers & Tiff Lacey - Strange Liaison (2007), Where Are You (2008)
- Michael Badal & Tiff Lacey – Don't Be Afraid (2008), Fairy Tale (2011)
- Aurosonic & Tiff Lacey - I Wish (2008), Always Together (2010)
- Vierro & Tiff Lacey - Storm (2009), World Without End (2011), Honesty (2013); Spirit of Fire, Ghost of the Heart, Cruel Doubt (2014)
- Der Mystik & Tiff Lacey - Watching the World (2010), A Story Told (2011)
- Matt Bukovski & Tiff Lacey – Swept Away (2011/2021), Speak Your Name (2011/2021)
- Alex M.O.R.P.H., Woody van Eyden & Tiff Lacey – I See You (2012), Dreamcatcher (2016)
- Rene Ablaze & Tiff Lacey - Tonight (2018), Universe Undone (2019), We Have the Stars (2019), Nebula (2020)
- illitheas & Tiff Lacey – Little Heart (2012); Lightning (2020)
- Sensorica & Tiff Lacey - When You Touch Me, Erogenic (2020), Sunray (2021)

=== Other notable collaborations ===
- Paul Oakenfold & Tiff Lacey – Hypnotised (2002)
- Redd Square & Tiff Lacey - In Your Hands (2002)
- The Thrillseekers & Tiff Lacey pres. Hydra – Affinity (2003)
- Filo & Peri & Tiff Lacey - Dance with a Devil (2005)
- Conjure One & Tiff Lacey - Face the Music (2005)
- Wippenberg & Tiff Lacey - Promised Land (2006)
- Bobina & Tiff Lacey – Where Did You Go (2007)
- First State & Tiff Lacey - Where Do We Go (2008)
- Tenishia & Tiff Lacey - Burning from the Inside (2008)
- Kopi Luwak & Tiff Lacey - Far and Away (2008)
- Rozza & Tiff Lacey - No More Rain (2008)
- George Acosta & Tiff Lacey - I Know (2010)
- Aly & Fila & Tiff Lacey – Paradise (2011)
- Edvard Viber & Tiff Lacey – Is This Love (2013)
- NoMosk & Tiff Lacey – The Promise (2015)
- Alex Kunnari & Tiff Lacey – In The Deep (2016)
- Zetandel & Tiff Lacey - Higher Ground (2022)
- Alex Wright, Nitrous Oxide & Tiff Lacey - Lose Myself (2022)
- Costa & Tiff Lacey - Fool's Gold (2023)
- Raz Nitzan & Tiff Lacey - Take Me Back to Winter (2024)
- Huvagen & Tiff Lacey - Echoes of a Journey (2024)
- Hypersia & Tiff Lacey - The Rapture (2024)
