= ATB (DJ) =

German DJ and record producer (born 1973)

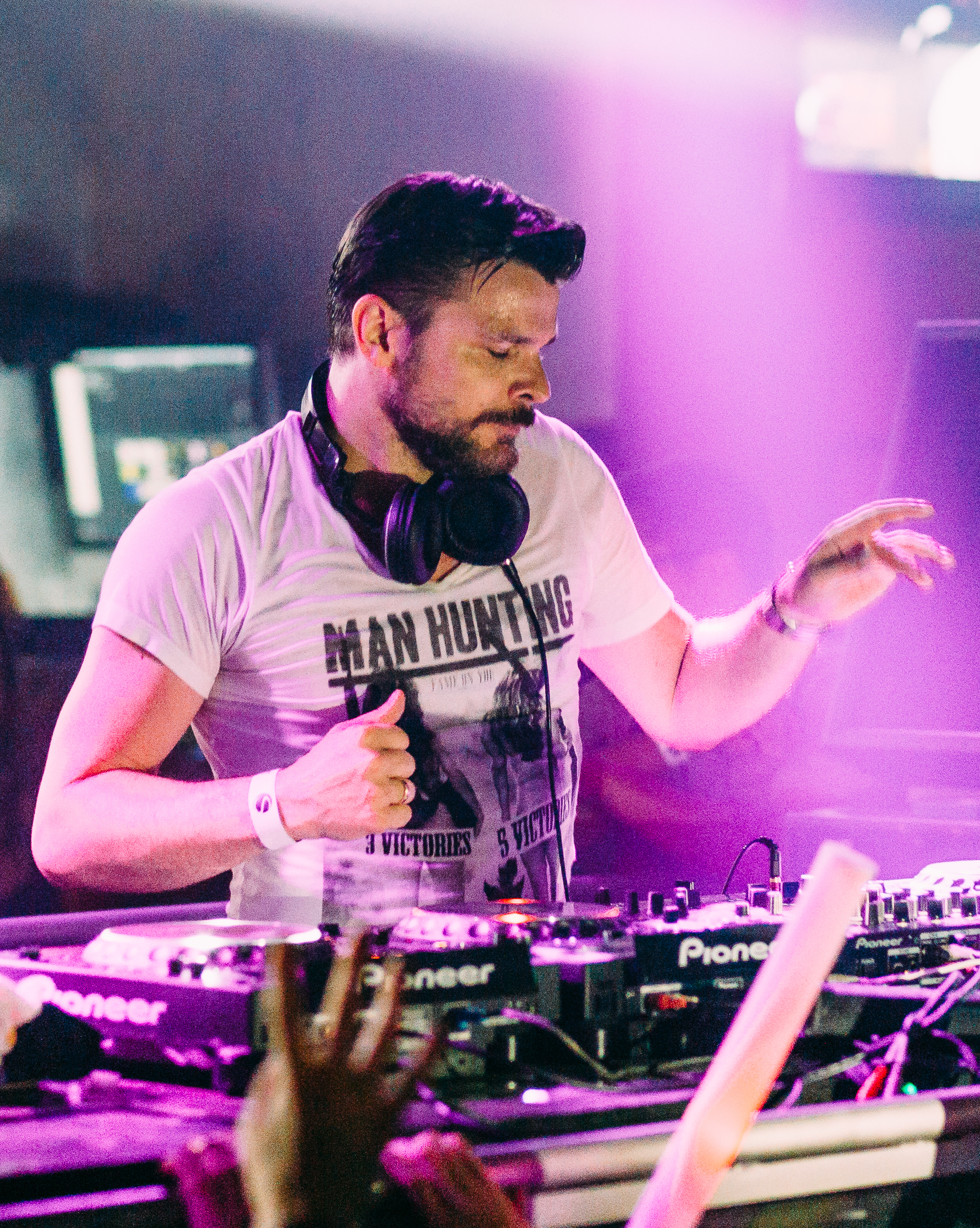
- Tanneberger in 2015

Background information
- Born: André Tanneberger; 26 February 1973 (age 53); Freiberg, East Germany
- Genres: Trance, progressive house
- Occupations: DJ, record producer, remixer
- Years active: 1993–present
- Label: Kontor
- Website: atb-music.com

André Tanneberger (German pronunciation: [anˈdʁeː ˈtanəbɛʁɡɐ], [ãˈdʁeː]; born 26 February 1973), better known by his stage name ATB, is a German DJ and producer of trance music. According to the official world DJ rankings governed by DJ Magazine, ATB was ranked No. 11 in 2009 and 2010, and No. 15 in 2011. In 2011, he was ranked as world No. 1 according to "The DJ List". He is best known for his 1998 single "9 PM (Till I Come)", which was a No. 1 single in the United Kingdom. The song's hook would later be reworked into "Don't Stop!" in 1999 for his debut album, Movin' Melodies, becoming a hit in its own right.

== Career ==
=== 1993-1999: "Sequential One" ===
Tanneberger started his music career in a dance project, Sequential One (SQ-1). In February 1993, the act released debut single "Let Me Hear You", followed by "Dance"/"Raving". However, these singles brought to André few earnings, so he later gained the opportunity to organize a mini-studio. In 1994 the project turned into the band, adding three new members: Ulrich Pöppelbaum, Woody van Eyden and vocalist Morpha. In early 1995 the "House Nation" record label released the group's first album, Dance.

After great success in its native Germany, Sequential One gradually became known elsewhere in Europe. Their second album, Energy, was also released in the Netherlands, Austria, Switzerland and Hungary. Despite this success and growing popularity, two members of the project — Woody van Eyden and Morpha — left in 1998, leaving only André and Ulrich in the band, and Sequential One was disbanded the following year. Shortly before the collapse, André released the last single "Angels" and the compilation album Decades.

=== 1998–1999: Formation of ATB and Movin' Melodies ===
In 1998, Tanneberger started a solo project named ATB. His first track under this name was "9 PM (Till I Come)", included on the Movin' Melodies album, which topped the UK Singles Chart in 1999. The track featured a synthesised slide guitar riff that became popular. This guitar sound became the trademark of his early hits. ATB continues to evolve and change with every album. His current style involves more vocals and varied sounds, with frequent pianos.

Despite only releasing a few more singles in the UK, namely "Don't Stop!" and "Killer", he still regularly releases music in his native Germany and in other parts of Europe, where he has scored big hits such as "I Don't Wanna Stop" and his cover of Olive's 1996 hit "You're Not Alone".

=== 2000–2001: Two Worlds ===
Two Worlds (released in 2000) was his second studio album. It is a two-disc album based upon the concept of different types of music for different moods. The titles of the two CDs are "The World of Movement" and "The Relaxing World". This album includes two songs featuring Heather Nova: "Love Will Find You" and "Feel You Like a River". The song "Let U Go" on "The World of Movement" disc features the vocals of Roberta Carter Harrison from the Canadian pop band Wild Strawberries. The song "Enigmatic Encounter" features music from the music project Enigma.

=== 2001–2002: Dedicated and ATC lawsuit ===
His third album, Dedicated, was released in 2002. It includes two top hits: "Hold You" and "You're Not Alone". The title refers to the September 11 attacks. In 2002 ATB successfully sued ATC's record label, forcing the band to change its name to A Touch of Class.

=== 2003: Addicted to Music ===
In 2003, ATB released Addicted to Music, which included hits such as "I Don't Wanna Stop" and "Long Way Home". The same year, ATB's first DVD, having the same name, was released. It featured all his videos, a tour documentary and photographs.

=== 2004: No Silence ===
ATB's hits "Ecstasy" and "Marrakech", both featuring vocals by Tiff Lacey, were included on the album No Silence (2004). "Marrakech" was also included on the soundtrack for the film Mindhunters.

=== 2005–2006: Seven Years ===
In 2005, ATB released Seven Years, a compilation album of 20 songs, including all his singles. Additionally, Seven Years includes six new tracks, including the single "Humanity" with Tiff Lacey and the 2005 rework of "Let U Go". Many of ATB's recent albums have featured vocals from Roberta Carter Harrison, singer for the Canadian band Wild Strawberries.

=== 2007–2008: Trilogy ===
His next album, Trilogy, was released on 4 May 2007. The single "Justify" was released from The DJ 4 in the Mix compilation. The single "Renegade" was released on 12 April 2007, and features Heather Nova. The third single was "Feel Alive", released in July the same year.

In a Trance.nu interview on 11 May 2007, ATB considered "Don't Stop!" to be his worst production to date, and he no longer stands by it, due to it being similar to his first hit, "9 PM (Till I Come)".

=== 2009–2010: Future Memories ===
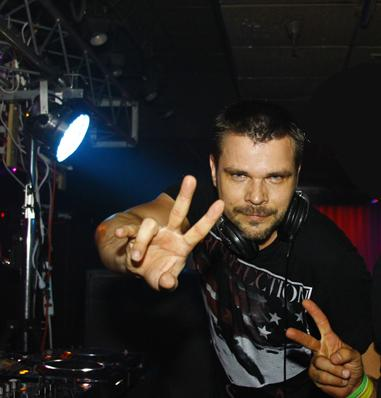
ATB in 2010

The album Future Memories was released on 5 May 2009. "What About Us" was released as the lead single prior to the album's release. Further hit tracks include the collaborations with Tiff Lacey on "My Everything", "Still Here" and "Missing" (a chillout cover of Everything but the Girl's classic).

=== 2011: Distant Earth ===
On 29 April 2011 Distant Earth was released, followed by Distant Earth Remixed on 16 September 2011.

=== 2012–2016: Contact ===
On 8 June 2012, Sunset Beach DJ Session 2 was released. On 24 March 2013, ATB announced during A State of Trance 600 Miami at Ultra Music Festival that he planned to release his next album during the second half of 2013. In September ATB posted that he was working on the last track of the album and that the new album would have 24 songs on two CDs. In addition, he announced that he would bring the ATB in Concert series to the United States with shows in Los Angeles, San Francisco, Chicago and New York City. ATB had kept the past six ATB in Concert shows in Eastern Europe.

ATB released an album titled Contact on 24 January 2014.

=== 2017–2020: neXt ===
On 10 February 2017, Andre announced through his Facebook account that his upcoming tenth studio album, Next (stylized as neXt), would be released on 21 April 2017. The album would be available in three versions: standard double-disc CD, Limited Edition Box and 12" double-vinyl package, which could be pre-ordered through Amazon starting the day of the announcement.

ATB released neXt on 21 April 2017 through Kontor Records.

=== 2021–present: "Your Love (9PM)" and final album ===
In 2021, a remake of "9 PM (Till I Come)" by ATB, German producer Topic and Swedish singer Alexander 'A7S' Tidebrink was released on Positiva Records. Retitled "Your Love (9PM)", the record charted in Germany and on the UK Official Charts Company Top 75 singles chart (reaching the number 42 position on 5 February 2021).

In May 2024, ATB announced on Instagram that his next album will be his last, due to "the current era of streaming and downloads, which have pushed albums out of the way in favor of singles and EPs", but reassured that he will continue to release singles and tour. He was reportedly "putting the final touches to the album" the following year, planning to be released in 2026.

== Personal life ==
ATB married his second wife, Laura Gabriela, on 6 July 2018, and they had a son in 2020 and a daughter in 2023.

== Discography ==
- Movin' Melodies (1999)
- Two Worlds (2000)
- Dedicated (2002)
- Addicted to Music (2003)
- No Silence (2004)
- Trilogy (2007)
- Future Memories (2009)
- Distant Earth (2011)
- Contact (2014)
- neXt (2017)

== DJ Magazine Top 100 DJs ==
Year	Position	Notes	Ref.
2003	47	New Entry	
2004	13	Up 34	
2005	9	Up 4	
2006	13	Down 4	
2007	26	Down 13	
2008	25	Up 1	
2009	11	Up 14	
2010	11	No Change	
2011	15	Down 4	
2012	21	Down 6	
2013	33	Down 12	
2014	58	Down 25	
2015	82	Down 24	
2016	61	Up 22	
2017	54	Up 7	
2018	49	Up 5	
2019	39	Up 10	
2020	56	Down 17	
2021	35	Up 21	
2022	42	Down 7	
2023	49	Down 7	
2024	47	Up 2	
2025	59	Down 12	
