= He's All That =

2021 film by Mark Waters

- Official release poster
- Directed by: Mark Waters
- Written by: R. Lee Fleming Jr.
- Based on: She's All That by R. Lee Fleming Jr.
- Produced by: Andrew Panay; Jennifer Gibgot; Bill Block
- Starring: Addison Rae; Tanner Buchanan; Madison Pettis; Peyton Meyer; Rachael Leigh Cook; Matthew Lillard
- Cinematography: John Guleserian
- Edited by: Travis Sittard
- Music by: Rolfe Kent
- Production companies: Miramax; Ethea Entertainment
- Distributed by: Netflix
- Release dates: August 25, 2021 (Hollywood); August 27, 2021 (United States)
- Running time: 91 minutes
- Country: United States
- Language: English
- Budget: $20 million

He's All That is a 2021 American teen romantic comedy film directed by Mark Waters, from a screenplay by R. Lee Fleming Jr. The film is a gender-swapped remake of the classic 1999 film She's All That, which was a modern adaptation of George Bernard Shaw's 1914 play Pygmalion and George Cukor's 1964 film My Fair Lady. It stars Addison Rae in her debut film appearance, Tanner Buchanan, Madison Pettis, and Peyton Meyer, along with Rachael Leigh Cook and Matthew Lillard, playing different versions from their original characters.

Talks for a remake of She's All That began in September 2020, with Waters to direct, Fleming Jr. set to return as the film's screenwriter, and Rae to star. Principal photography began in December 2020 in Los Angeles, California.

He's All That had its world premiere at the NeueHouse in Hollywood, California on August 25, 2021, before debuting on Netflix on August 27, 2021. The film was the most-watched film on Netflix during its release week.

== Plot ==
Padgett Sawyer is an influencer in her final year of high school who lives with her divorced mother, a local nurse. She pretends to live in an upscale condo to hide her real living conditions from her followers and sponsors, fearing they would not like her.

One day, Padgett discovers that her boyfriend, influencer and aspiring hip-hop artist Jordan Van Draanen, is cheating on her with a backup dancer. She finds herself humiliated when a live stream of her outburst results in losing followers and sponsorship deals because the camera was still on when it happened.

To redeem herself, Padgett accepts a bet to turn Cameron Kweller, an antisocial photographer and the school's least popular young man, into prom king. Despite his indifference towards her, Padgett continues with the bet. She gains information about Cameron from his younger sister, Brin. To get closer to him, Padgett convinces him to give her horse riding lessons.

Over time, while keeping her word on the bet, Padgett begins to bond more with Cameron. She discovers that he and Brin lost their mother years ago in a plane crash, so they live with their grandmother while their father resides in Sweden. Padgett fixes Cameron's appearance and attire and tries to expand his social interactions at her friend Quinn's party, where he saves her from humiliation when Jordan appears with the backup dancer.

At Padgett's friend Alden's Great Gatsby-themed birthday party, Cameron fights with Jordan when he tries to get sexual with Brin. His mother's camera is ruined in the process, causing him to leave the party in a rage despite Padgett's attempts to console him. She regrets following through with the bet but does not back down because otherwise, she would have to show the whole school and her social media her authentic self.

The next day, Alden turns on Padgett, revealing her plot to become prom queen alongside Jordan, showing her true colors. She is also responsible for intentionally live-streaming Padgett's outburst.

Padgett begins to fall for Cameron, but she is afraid to express her feelings after she kisses him. When Brin finds out that Padgett kissed him, she suggests he ask her to prom. To ensure Padgett's loss, Alden exposes her bet with Padgett to Cameron, who now believes that she only feigned interest due to the bet.

On the prom day, Padgett's mother encourages her to still go, suggesting she go as herself and not as a social influencer. Cameron refuses to go to prom. Padgett asks Brin to help, so she, realizing her older brother has been smiling for the first time since their mother's death thanks to Padgett, Brin persuades him to go.

Cameron does not show up at the prom itself, but Padgett live streams a speech confessing to her real truths, then declines her role as Prom Queen. To Alden's surprise, Principal Bosch names Celeste the Prom Queen. Padgett finds Cameron outside the school on a horse and kisses him after apologizing.

Padgett gains her fan following back, taking her social media influencing in a new direction by traveling to various destinations across the world alongside her devoted boyfriend Cameron.

== Cast ==
- Addison Rae as Padgett Sawyer, a social media influencer who is hiding the fact that she is poor from her affluent high school
- Tanner Buchanan as Cameron Kweller, an anti-social rebel and amateur photographer
- Madison Pettis as Alden Pierce, Padgett's affluent and social status-aware best friend, later rival
- Peyton Meyer as Jordan Van Draanen, Padgett's ex-boyfriend who is a hip-hop artist and also a social media influencer
- Rachael Leigh Cook as Anna Sawyer, Padgett's mother who works as a nurse. Cook returns from She's All That, in a different role, having originally played Laney Boggs.
- Matthew Lillard as Principal Bosch, the school's principal. Lillard returns from She's All That, in a different role, having originally played Brock Hudson.
- Isabella Crovetti as Brin Kweller, Cameron's popularity-seeking younger sister
- Annie Jacob as Nisha, Cameron's best and only friend
- Myra Molloy as Quinn, Padgett's other best friend who is more supportive of her than Alden is. She and Nisha go to prom together.
- Kourtney Kardashian as Jessica Miles Torres, a woman who sponsors Padgett on social media
- Vanessa Dubasso as Aniston, a dancer who Jordan cheats on Padgett with
- Heather Ann Gottlieb as Celeste, a gothic rebel who despises the high school experience even more than Cameron does
- Romel De Silva as Sebastian Woo, a student who excels in science
- Andrew Matarazzo as Logan, Jordan's friend
- Dominic Goodman as Track, Jordan's friend
- Jill Basey as Grandma, Cameron and Brin's grandmother who has taken them in to live with her
- Evan Fields as Jamal, the prom's DJ

== Production ==
In September 2020, a gender-swapped remake of She's All That was announced by Miramax titled He's All That, with Mark Waters to direct, original screenwriter R. Lee Fleming Jr. to write, and Addison Rae to star. Tanner Buchanan had also been cast, along with Myra Molloy, Madison Pettis, Peyton Meyer, Isabella Crovetti, and Annie Jacob.

In December 2020, Rachael Leigh Cook joined the cast to portray Rae's character's mother. It was confirmed Cook's character is not related to her original character. Andrew Matarazzo, Vanessa Dubasso, Brian Torres, Romel De Silva, Dominic Goodman, Ryan Hollis, and Tiffany Simon also joined the production.

Filming took place at Union Station, Los Angeles, in December 2020. The city was criticized for its decision to close a COVID-19 testing site to accommodate the filmmakers. The decision was reversed and the testing site was able to continue working while the filming took place. In August 2021, the song "Kiss Me" was covered by Cyn for the film's soundtrack.

== Soundtrack ==
List of songs featured in He's All That

Title	Performer(s)
"Carried Away"	Surf Mesa, Madison Beer
"Electric"	Katy Perry
"Go Bad"	Blu DeTiger
"Better Without You"	TCTS, Glowie, Saffron Stone
"Chain My Heart"	Topic, Bebe Rexha
"Stop Talkin"	Valentino Khan, Alma
"ILY (I Love You Baby)"	Surf Mesa, Emilee
"Jalebi Baby"	Tesher
"Easy"	Troye Sivan, Kacey Musgraves, Mark Ronson
"Your Love"	ATB, Topic, A7S
"Losing It"	Fisher
"Kiss Me"	Cyn
"Mean Streets of Pali"	Kaz Gamble, Doug Ray
"Dance Off" (credits)	Macklemore & Ryan Lewis, Idris Elba, Anderson .Paak

== Release ==
He's All That had its world premiere at the NeueHouse in Hollywood, California on August 25, 2021, before it was released on August 27, 2021, by Netflix. According to Netflix, it was the number one film on their service that week.

== Reception ==
On Rotten Tomatoes, the film has an approval rating of 28% based on reviews from 60 critics, with an average rating of 4/10. The website's critics consensus read, "Hobbled by a lack of chemistry between its stars, He's All That comes up short on numerous opportunities to improve upon its gender-swapped source material." On Metacritic, the film has a weighted average score of 36 out of 100 based on reviews from 22 critics, indicating "generally unfavorable reviews".

Courtney Howard of Variety said "He's All That makes some smart alterations to the original despite mimeographing the structure, and strikes a benevolent balance between old and new with a light sprinkling of references. However, there are many more maddeningly underwhelming elements." ABC News' Peter Travers gave a negative review, saying "manufactured for the Kissing Booth crowd, this gender-swapped, TikTok-friendly update of the 1999 teen hit sounds awful and it often is, but enough charm pokes through the cracks to sucker anyone who ever fell for a makeover fable." Robyn Bahr of The Hollywood Reporter wrote: "He's All That may be a flattened reflection of its predecessor, but both films are charming enough to get away with about one anal sex innuendo joke apiece" and that the film "is really no worse than the first film."

Nell Minow, writing for RogerEbert.com, was more positive in her review of the film, giving it a score of 3 out of 4 stars. She wrote: "sweet little end of summer sorbet with appealing young performers and a script that refreshes the original without overdoing it." Michael Ordoña of the Los Angeles Times gave a mostly positive review by stating "You'll be pleased to discover the entertaining remake has its charms; it actually is all that, for the most part."

The Guardian described He's All That as a "dull TikTok teen remake" that "lacks charm" and the film was "ultimately stale bait for nostalgia, a recipe that does not amount to charm". Paste criticized it as a "nightmarish, joyless commentary on influencer-beholden adolescence" and the cinematography work.

Common Sense Media rated the film 3 out of 5 stars. Glamour noted the film "hits more than a few clichés" but says the characters "work well enough" while "the plot is a little underdeveloped".
