= List of German airplay number-one songs of 2020 =

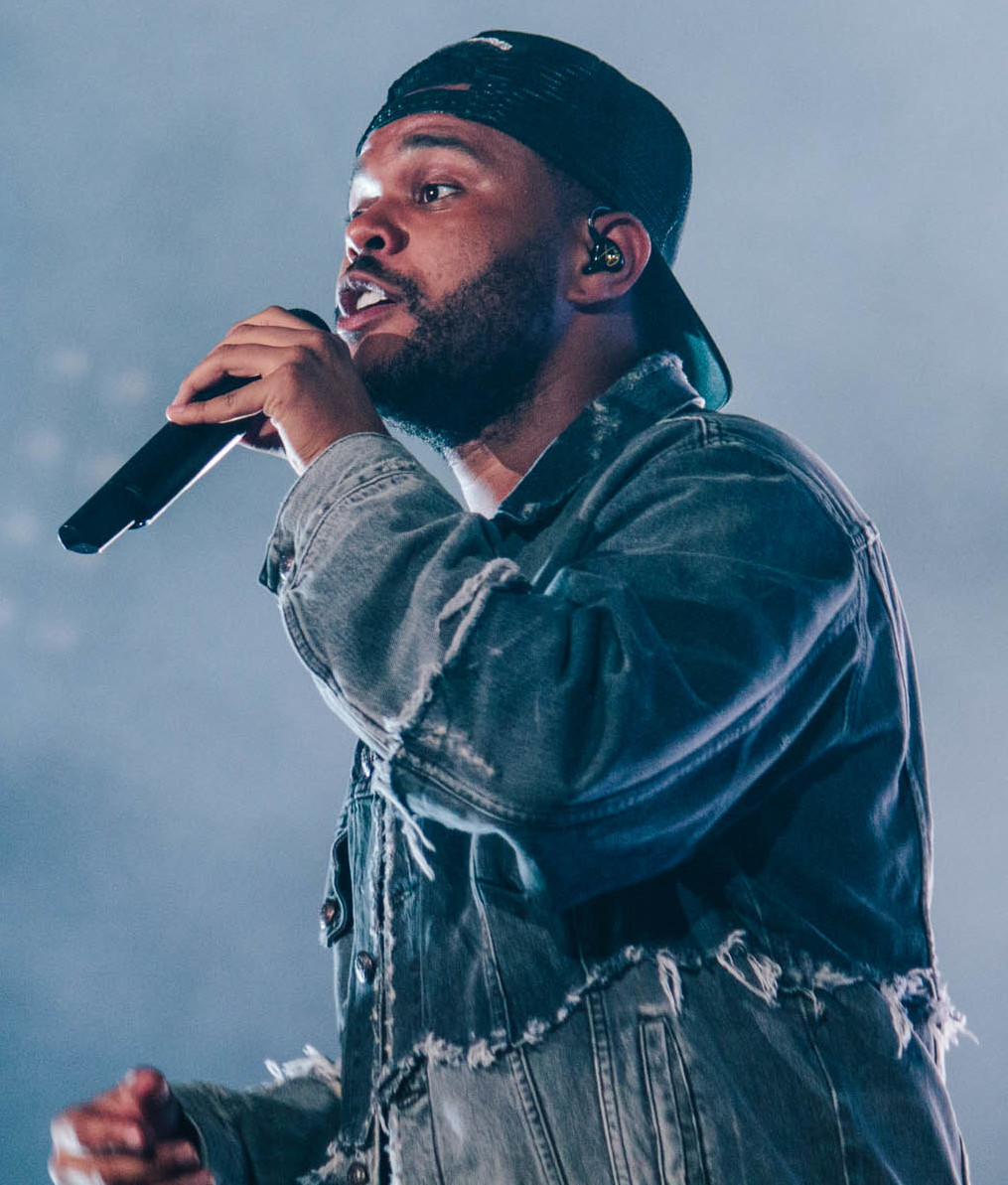
The Weeknd's (pictured in 2018) "Blinding Lights" was the best performing song of 2020.

The official German Airplay Chart is an airplay chart compiled by Nielsen Music Control on behalf of Bundesverband Musikindustrie (Federal Association of Phonographic Industry).

== Chart history ==
Key
| † | Indicates best-performing single of 2020 |
| ‡ | Indicates singles which also reached the top of the German singles chart |

| Issue date | Title | Artist(s) | Ref. |
|---|---|---|---|
| 3 January | "Don't Start Now" | Dua Lipa | |
| 10 January | "Don't Start Now" | Dua Lipa | |
| 17 January | "Don't Start Now" | Dua Lipa | |
| 24 January | "Don't Start Now" | Dua Lipa | |
| 31 January | "Blinding Lights" † ‡ | The Weeknd | |
| 7 February | "Blinding Lights" † ‡ | The Weeknd | |
| 14 February | "Blinding Lights" † ‡ | The Weeknd | |
| 21 February | "Blinding Lights" † ‡ | The Weeknd | |
| 28 February | "Blinding Lights" † ‡ | The Weeknd | |
| 6 March | "Blinding Lights" † ‡ | The Weeknd | |
| 13 March | "Breaking Me" | Topic featuring A7S | |
| 20 March | "Breaking Me" | Topic featuring A7S | |
| 27 March | "Fingertips" | Tom Gregory | |
| 3 April | "Breaking Me" | Topic featuring A7S | |
| 10 April | "Breaking Me" | Topic featuring A7S | |
| 17 April | "Salt" | Ava Max | |
| 24 April | "Salt" | Ava Max | |
| 1 May | "Salt" | Ava Max | |
| 8 May | "Physical" | Dua Lipa | |
| 15 May | "Stupid Love" | Lady Gaga | |
| 22 May | "Stupid Love" | Lady Gaga | |
| 29 May | "Stupid Love" | Lady Gaga | |
| 5 June | "Supalonely" | Benee featuring Gus Dapperton | |
| 12 June | "Supalonely" | Benee featuring Gus Dapperton | |
| 19 June | "Supalonely" | Benee featuring Gus Dapperton | |
| 26 June | "Kings & Queens" | Ava Max | |
| 3 July | "Kings & Queens" | Ava Max | |
| 10 July | "Kings & Queens" | Ava Max | |
| 17 July | "Kings & Queens" | Ava Max | |
| 24 July | "Kings & Queens" | Ava Max | |
| 31 July | "Kings & Queens" | Ava Max | |
| 7 August | "Übermorgen" | Mark Forster | |
| 14 August | "Übermorgen" | Mark Forster | |
| 21 August | "Alane" | Robin Schulz and Wes | |
| 28 August | "Alane" | Robin Schulz and Wes | |
| 4 September | "Alane" | Robin Schulz and Wes | |
| 11 September | "Alane" | Robin Schulz and Wes | |
| 18 September | "Alane" | Robin Schulz and Wes | |
| 25 September | "Savage Love (Laxed – Siren Beat)" ‡ | Jawsh 685 and Jason Derulo | |
| 2 October | "Alane" | Robin Schulz and Wes | |
| 9 October | "What's Love Got to Do with It" | Kygo and Tina Turner | |
| 16 October | "What's Love Got to Do with It" | Kygo and Tina Turner | |
| 23 October | "What's Love Got to Do with It" | Kygo and Tina Turner | |
| 30 October | "Midnight Sky" | Miley Cyrus | |
| 6 November | "Midnight Sky" | Miley Cyrus | |
| 13 November | "Midnight Sky" | Miley Cyrus | |
| 20 November | "Midnight Sky" | Miley Cyrus | |
| 27 November | "Let's Love" | David Guetta and Sia | |
| 4 December | "Let's Love" | David Guetta and Sia | |
| 11 December | "Diamonds" | Sam Smith | |
| 18 December | "Diamonds" | Sam Smith | |
| 25 December | "Diamonds" | Sam Smith | |
