= Drive (Clean Bandit and Topic song) =

2021 single by Clean Bandit and Topic featuring Wes Nelson

Single by Clean Bandit and Topic featuring Wes Nelson
- Released: 30 July 2021
- Genre: Dance-pop; disco
- Length: 2:59
- Label: Atlantic
- Songwriters: Alex Oriet; Alexander Tidebrink; David Phelan; Grace Chatto; Henry Tucker; Jack Patterson; Tobias Topic
- Producers: Grace Chatto; Jack Patterson; Mark Ralph; Salt Wives; Topic

Clean Bandit singles chronology
| "Higher" (2021) | "Drive" (2021) | "How Will I Know" (2021) |

Topic singles chronology
| "Chain My Heart" (2021) | "Drive" (2021) | "My Heart Goes (La Di Da)" (2021) |

Wes Nelson singles chronology
| "Nice to Meet Ya" (2021) | "Drive" (2021) | "Say Nothing" (2021) |

Music video
- "Drive" on YouTube

"Drive" is a song by British electronic music group Clean Bandit and German DJ Topic featuring English recording artist Wes Nelson. It was released on 30 July 2021, via Atlantic Records.

== Critical reception ==
Simone Ciaravolo of Edm-Lab opined that the track "[is] full of positive vibes", and "brings [us] on a metaphorical nocturnal journey: the scenery of a newborn love story."

== Music video ==
The music video was released on 6 August 2021, and directed by Dan Massie. It features Nelson as "a happy lorry driver, performing from the cab of his big truck through country and city, and into outer space." Katrina Rees of Celebmix praised the visual "perfectly captures the upbeat nature of the track, which is laced with pulsating beats and glossy strings."

== Credits and personnel ==
Credits adapted from AllMusic.

- Grace Chatto – cello, producer, vocal producer
- Clean Bandit – primary artist
- Molly Fletcher – violin
- Stuart Hawkes – mastering
- Chloe Kraemer – engineer
- Wes Nelson – featured artist, vocals
- Alex Oriet – bass, composer, drums, keyboards, programmer, synthesizer
- Jack Patterson – composer, drums, keyboards, producer, programmer, synthesizer, vocal producer
- Luke Patterson – drums, keyboards, programmer, synthesizer
- David Phelan – bass, composer, drums, keyboards, programmer, synthesizer
- Beatrice Philips – violin
- Mark Ralph – drums, keyboards, mixing, producer, programmer, synthesizer
- Salt Wives – producer
- Alexander Tidebrink – composer
- Topic – drums, keyboards, primary artist, producer, programmer, synthesizer, composer
- Henry Tucker – composer

== Charts ==
=== Weekly charts ===
Weekly chart performance for "Drive"
| Chart (2021) | Peak position |
|---|---|
| Hungary (Editors' Choice Top 40) | 38 |
| Ireland (IRMA) | 30 |
| New Zealand Hot Singles (RMNZ) | 36 |
| San Marino (SMRRTV Top 50) | 15 |
| Slovakia Airplay (ČNS IFPI) | 22 |
| UK Singles (OCC) | 17 |
| UK Dance (OCC) | 5 |
| US Hot Dance/Electronic Songs (Billboard) | 25 |

=== Year-end charts ===
Year-end chart performance for "Drive"
| Chart (2021) | Position |
|---|---|
| US Hot Dance/Electronic Songs (Billboard) | 95 |

== Certifications ==
Certifications for "Drive"
| Region | Certification | Certified units/sales |
|---|---|---|
| Italy (FIMI) | Gold | 50,000^{‡} |
| Poland (ZPAV) | Gold | 25,000^{‡} |
| United Kingdom (BPI) | Platinum | 600,000^{‡} |
^{‡} Sales+streaming figures based on certification alone.
