= Why Do You Lie to Me =

2020 single by Topic and A7S featuring Lil Baby

Single by Topic and A7S featuring Lil Baby
- Released: 28 August 2020
- Genre: Dance-pop
- Length: 2:51
- Label: Virgin
- Songwriters: Alexander Tidebrink; Dominique Jones; Tobias Topic
- Producer: Tobias Topic

Topic singles chronology
"Like I Love You" (2020)	"Why Do You Lie to Me" (2020)	"Lost" (2020)

A7S singles chronology
"Breaking Me" (2019)	"Why Do You Lie to Me" (2020)	"Your Love (9PM)" (2021)

Lil Baby singles chronology
"Don't Need Time" (2020)	"Why Do You Lie to Me" (2020)	"For the Night" (2020)

Music video
- "Why Do You Lie to Me" on YouTube

"Why Do You Lie to Me" is a song by German producer Topic and Swedish singer A7S featuring American rapper Lil Baby. It was released as a single on 28 August 2020 by Virgin Records. The song was written by the three artists and produced by Topic.

== Content ==
"Why Do You Lie to Me" is a melancholic dance track that starts with a calm instrumental and slowly builds up. It consists of an emotional piano melody, the harmonic voice of A7S and the ad-libs of Lil Baby. Topic mentioned it combined hip-hop and dance music and said to German radio 1LIVE: "Especially in these days when people have so much access to all the music out there, there are a lot more crossovers right now. It's always been fun doing different genres."

== Music video ==
The music video was released on 2 November 2020 and directed by Dagi Bee. Topic, A7S, and TikTok creators Anna Klinski and Tim Schaecker appear in the video. It explores themes of love, loss and sensuality, painted a hazy picture of a party where reality and illusion blur.

== Personnel ==
Credits adapted from Qobuz.

- Topic – production, mixing, drums, bass, synthesizer, programming
- A7S – vocals, drums, piano
- Lil Baby – vocals
- Manuel Reuter – mastering

== Charts ==
=== Weekly charts ===
Weekly chart performance for "Why Do You Lie to Me"
Chart (2020–2021)	Peak position
Australia (ARIA)	94
Belgium (Ultratip Bubbling Under Flanders)	4
Belgium (Ultratip Bubbling Under Wallonia)	16
Bulgaria (PROPHON)	2
CIS Airplay (TopHit)	20
Croatia (HRT)	72
Germany (GfK)	98
Poland (Polish Airplay Top 100)	60
Russia Airplay (TopHit)	13
San Marino (SMRRTV Top 50)	17
Slovakia Airplay (ČNS IFPI)	41
Sweden Heatseeker (Sverigetopplistan)	7
Switzerland (Schweizer Hitparade)	86
Ukraine Airplay (TopHit)	31
US Hot Dance/Electronic Songs (Billboard)	17

=== Year-end charts ===
Year-end chart performance for "Why Do You Lie to Me"
Chart (2020)	Position
CIS (TopHit)	65
Russia Airplay (TopHit)	59
US Hot Dance/Electronic Songs (Billboard)	92

== Certifications ==
Certifications for "Why Do You Lie to Me"
Region	Certification	Certified units/sales
Brazil (Pro-Música Brasil)	Gold	20,000^{‡}
^{‡} Sales+streaming figures based on certification alone.
