= 9 PM (Till I Come) =

1998 single by ATB

Single by ATB

from the album Movin' Melodies
- Released: 26 October 1998
- Genre: Dance
- Length: 6:35 (original); 3:13 (radio and album edit); 2:44 (UK Radio Edit)
- Label: Kontor
- Songwriters: André Tanneberger; Angel Ferrerons; Julio Posadas; Yolanda Rivera
- Producer: ATB

ATB singles chronology
"9 PM (Till I Come)" (1998)	"Don't Stop!" (1999)

Audio sample
- Six-second sample which highlights the pitch-bent guitar sound that is ATB's trademark: file; help

Music video
- "9 PM (Till I Come)" on YouTube

"9 PM (Till I Come)" is a song by German DJ and producer ATB from his debut studio album, Movin' Melodies (1999). It was co-written by ATB, Angel Ferrerons, Julio Posadas and Yolanda Rivera. It features vocals by Spanish model Yolanda Rivera and a synthesizer hook created on guitar. The track's hook would later be reworked into the single "Don't Stop!" in 1999, which also featured on Movin' Melodies and also proved very popular.

"9 PM (Till I Come)" was released by Kontor Records on 26 October 1998 as ATB's debut single. A remix of the song topped the UK Singles Chart and Irish Singles Chart, and the song also charted within the top 10 in Australia, Denmark, Greece, Italy, and Norway. A remake with German DJ producer Topic and Swedish singer A7S was released by Virgin Records on 15 January 2021. Tiësto also released a remix of the remake.

== Background and release ==
ATB (a.k.a. André Tanneberger) started his music career in the German dance project Sequential One. Singles brought ATB small financial benefits; he gained the opportunity to organize a mini-studio. In 1999, Sequential One ceased to exist. In 1998, Tanneberger started a solo project named ATB and his first track under this name was "9 PM (Till I Come)". He met a girl and they'd planned to go to the cinema for a date. She was interested in how he was producing music and a tour of the studio resulted in the initial hook. Tanneberger told in a 2024 interview with DJ Mag, "She was interested in to how are you producing music? And I had a really nice little studio these days and, showed her, okay, here, I can do a beat. Here is a guitar sound. And I played this melody. Right in this moment, I recognized, oh this is kind of an interesting melody. And so I started to work the melody and it was going further. And I put the bass in it and programmed. And I finally forgot that she's there, after a time she said, 'Very interesting. But we have to go to the cinema.'"

Because the clock was 9 p.m., he saved the track as "9 PM" after the time they left the studio to continue their date. The next day, he returned to the studio and finished the track. It needed some vocals and his management who had a lot of records, gave him an a cappella named "Till I Come". Tanneberger took it out and put it into the track. At first, he thought nobody would buy the track, but when he got the positive reactions from record companies wanting to buy it, he decided to release it. "9 PM (Till I Come)" was signed to Kontor Records and got picked up from Ministry of Sound.

For the Ministry of Sound release, a remix by Sequential One was used rather than the original radio/ album version. The release initially charted at number 68 on the UK Singles Chart on 12-inch sales only. The track was re-released in the UK, again with the Sequential One remix rather than the original version being used. Upon re-release, the track peaked at number one on the UK chart. ATB performed the song on the Top of the Pops, standing at the top of a large box, surrounded by dancers.

The song was written and produced solely by ATB, composed in the key of A minor with a tempo of 130 beats per minute. The UK radio edit (an edit of the Seqential One 1999 remix) is composed in the key of A minor with a tempo of 135 beats per minute.

== Critical reception ==
In The Independent, Barney Hoskyns cited the song's "purring titillation" as an example of trance music sublimating sexuality. NME's Sarah Anderson called it "the woozy sound of Ibiza when it's just too hot" and described Rivera's vocals as "suitably breathy".

== Chart performance ==
"9 PM (Till I Come)" peaked at number 14 on the German Singles Chart. Internationally, the song was also successful. In the United Kingdom, "9 PM (Till I Come)" entered at the top of the UK Singles Chart on 27 June 1999 – for the week ending dated 3 July 1999 – becoming the first trance song to top the UK Singles Chart. "9 PM (Till I Come)" remained at the summit of the chart for two weeks before being dethroned by "Livin' La Vida Loca" by Ricky Martin and became Britain's fifth-best-selling single of 1999. As of July 2014, it has sold over 890,000 copies in the United Kingdom. In Ireland, the single peaked at the top of the Irish Singles Chart for four consecutive weeks. In Denmark, "9 PM (Till I Come)" peaked at number three on the Danish Singles Chart – as well as peaking at the same position on the Italian Singles Chart and Norwegian Singles Chart in Italy and Norway respectively. In the Flanders region of Belgium, the single peaked at number five on the Ultratop Flanders 50 Singles Chart. In Australia, "9 PM (Till I Come)" peaked at number ten on the ARIA Singles Chart.

== Music video ==
A music video was produced to promote the single. Tannenberger has said that it does not have a story. He told in an interview, "I don't understand the story till today. I think there's no story behind. It's just pictures. Somebody wrote it, and the record company arranged it, and I, then I was there, and can't explain what's going on there and why I have this, burnt and exploding and all these things. It's just crazy. But that's the way it is, you know? But I recognize from this video, if I do more videos in the future, I take care about it."

== Track listings ==
- 9 PM (Till I Come) (Amir Sattarpour Release_Iran Release)
1. "9 PM (Till I Come)" (Radio Edit) – 3:14
2. "9 PM (Till I Come)" (Club Mix) – 5:25
3. "9 PM (Till I Come)" (9 PM Mix) – 6:07
4. "9 PM (Till I Come)" (Sequential One Remix) – 6:33
5. "9 PM (Till I Come)" (Gary D's Northern Light Remix) – 7:29
6. "9 PM (Till I Come)" (Spacekid Remix) – 6:40
7. "9 PM (Till I Come)" (Signum Remix) – 7:34
- 9 PM (Till I Come) (Germany Release 1)
1. "9 PM (Till I Come)" (Radio Edit) – 3:19
2. "9 PM (Till I Come)" (Club Mix) – 5:25
3. "9 PM (Till I Come)" (9 PM Mix) 6:10
- 9 PM (Till I Come) (Germany Release 2)
1. "9 PM (Till I Come)" (Radio Edit) – 3:14
2. "9 PM (Till I Come)" (Club Mix) – 5:25
3. "9 PM (Till I Come)" (9 PM Mix) – 6:07
4. "9 PM (Till I Come)" (Sequential One Remix) – 6:33
5. "9 PM (Till I Come)" (Gary D's Northern Light Remix) – 7:29
6. "9 PM (Till I Come)" (Spacekid Remix) – 6:40
- 9 PM (Till I Come) (The UK Mixes) (Germany Release)
1. "9 PM (Till I Come)" (Radio Mix UK) – 2:43
2. "9 PM (Till I Come)" (Signum Remix) – 7:33
3. "9 PM (Till I Come)" (Sequential One 1999 Remix) – 6:33
- 9 PM (Till I Come) (U.S. Release)
1. "9 PM (Till I Come)" (Radio Mix) – 3:16
2. "9 PM (Till I Come)" (Club Mix) – 5:27
3. "9 PM (Till I Come)" (Sequential One Remix) – 6:33
4. "9 PM (Till I Come)" (Gary D's Northern Light Remix) – 7:26
5. "9 PM (Till I Come)" (Signum Remix) – 7:33
- UK first release
1. "9 PM (Till I Come)" (Signum Remix) – 7:33
2. "9 PM (Till I Come)" (Sequential One 1999 Remix) – 6:33
- 9 PM (Till I Come) (UK second release - CD)
1. "9 PM (Till I Come)" (Radio Edit) – 2:43
2. "9 PM (Till I Come)" (Sequential One 1999 Remix) – 6:33
3. "9 PM (Till I Come)" (Signum Remix) – 7:33
- 9 PM (Till I Come) (UK second release - 12")
1. "9 PM (Till I Come)" (Sequential One 1999 Remix) – 6:33
2. "9 PM (Till I Come)" (Signum Remix) – 5:29
3. "9 PM (Till I Come)" (Matt Darey Remix) – 8:05
- 9 PM (Till I Come) (Australia Release)
1. "9 PM (Till I Come)" (Original Radio Edit) – 3:17
2. "9 PM (Till I Come)" (Club Mix) – 5:27
3. "9 PM (Till I Come)" (9pm Mix) – 6:09
4. "9 PM (Till I Come)" (Signum Remix) – 7:34
5. "9 PM (Till I Come)" (Sequential One 1999 Remix) – 6:33
6. "9 PM (Till I Come)" (Sequential One Original Remix) – 6:10
- 9 PM (Till I Come) (Netherlands Release 1)
1. "9 PM (Till I Come)" (Radio Edit) – 3:14
2. "9 PM (Till I Come)" (9PM Mix) – 6:06
- 9 PM (Till I Come) (Netherlands Release 2)
1. "9 PM (Till I Come)" (Radio Edit) – 3:14
2. "9 PM (Till I Come)" (9PM Mix) – 6:07
3. "9 PM (Till I Come)" (Club Mix) – 5:25
4. "9 PM (Till I Come)" (Sequential One Remix) – 6:33
5. "9 PM (Till I Come)" (Gary D's Northern Light Remix) – 7:28
- 9 PM (Till I Come) (Italy Release)
1. "9 PM (Till I Come)" (Radio Edit) – 3:19
2. "9 PM (Till I Come)" (Club Mix) – 5:28
3. "9 PM (Till I Come)" (9 PM Mix) – 6:10
4. "9 PM (Till I Come)" (Sequential One Remix) – 6:33

== Charts ==
=== Weekly charts ===
1998–1999 weekly chart performance for "9 PM (Till I Come)"
Chart (1998–1999)	Peak position
Australia (ARIA)	10
Belgium (Ultratip Bubbling Under Flanders)	5
Belgium Dance (Ultratop Flanders)	11
Canada (Nielsen SoundScan)	11
Canada Dance/Urban (RPM)	5
Denmark (IFPI)	3
Europe (Eurochart Hot 100)	9
Finland (Suomen virallinen lista)	13
Germany (GfK)	14
Greece (IFPI)	2
Iceland (Íslenski Listinn Topp 40)	20
Ireland (IRMA)	1
Italy (Musica e dischi)	3
Netherlands (Dutch Top 40)	11
Netherlands (Single Top 100)	12
New Zealand (Recorded Music NZ)	11
Norway (VG-lista)	3
Scottish Singles Sales (Official Charts)	1
Sweden (Sverigetopplistan)	31
Switzerland (Schweizer Hitparade)	21
UK Singles (Official Charts)	1
UK Dance (Official Charts)	1
US Dance Club Songs (Billboard)	7
US Dance Singles Sales (Billboard)	11

2020–2025 weekly chart performance for "9 PM (Till I Come)"
Chart (2020–2025)	Peak position
Hungary (Single Top 40)	30
Poland Airplay (ZPAV)	93
Ukraine Airplay (TopHit)	25

=== Year-end charts ===
1999 year-end chart performance for "9 PM (Till I Come)"
Chart (1999)	Position
Australia (ARIA)	38
Canada Dance/Urban (RPM)	19
Europe (Eurochart Hot 100)	72
Europe Border Breakers (Music & Media)	21
Netherlands (Dutch Top 40)	83
Netherlands (Single Top 100)	86
New Zealand (RIANZ)	49
Romania (Romanian Top 100)	23
UK Singles (OCC)	5
UK Airplay (Music Week)	31

2000 year-end chart performance for "9 PM (Till I Come)"
Chart (2000)	Position
US Maxi-Singles Sales (Billboard)	38

== Certifications ==
Sales and certifications for "9 PM (Till I Come)"
Region	Certification	Certified units/sales
Australia (ARIA)	Platinum	70,000^{^}
New Zealand (RMNZ)	Gold	15,000^{‡}
Norway (IFPI Norway)	Gold	
Sweden (GLF)	Platinum	30,000^{^}
United Kingdom (BPI)	2× Platinum	890,000
^{^} Shipments figures based on certification alone.^{‡} Sales+streaming figures based on certification alone.

== Release history ==
Release dates and formats for "9 PM (Till I Come)"
Region	Date	Format(s)	Label(s)	Ref.
Europe	26 October 1998	CD	Kontor	
United Kingdom	21 June 1999	12-inch vinyl; CD; cassette	Sound of Ministry	

== "Your Love (9PM)" ==
"Your Love (9PM)"

Single by ATB x Topic x A7S
- Released: 15 January 2021
- Length: 2:30
- Label: Virgin
- Songwriters: André Tanneberger; Tobias Topic; Alexander Tidebrink
- Producers: ATB; Rudi Dittmann; Topic

ATB singles chronology
"Heartbeat" (2019)	"Your Love (9PM)" (2021)	"Simply Mad" (2021)

Topic singles chronology
"Lost" (2020)	"Your Love (9PM)" (2021)	"Chain My Heart" (2021)

A7S singles chronology
"Why Do You Lie to Me" (2020)	"Your Love (9PM)" (2021)	"Nirvana" (2021)

Music video
- "Your Love (9PM)" on YouTube

A remake of the song titled "Your Love (9PM)" by ATB, German DJ and producer Topic and Swedish singer A7S was released by Virgin Records on 15 January 2021. It was written by the three artists and produced by ATB, Rudi Dittmann and Topic. ATB approached Topic through a mutual acquaintance about the idea of a remake after being inspired by the melancholic sound of his 2020 single "Breaking Me". They met in a studio in Germany for the collaboration and worked with A7S on the lyrics and vocals via Zoom. The lyrics were written in one take. It is composed in the key of A minor with a tempo of 126 beats per minute. A remix by Dutch DJ Tiësto was released on 26 March 2021.

"Your Love (9PM)" peaked at number nine on US Hot Dance/Electronic Songs, becoming the first top 10 single on the chart for ATB and the second for Topic and A7S. The song reached number eight in its tenth week on the UK Singles Chart with sales of 26,909 units, making it ATB's fourth UK top 10 and first since his 2000 single "Killer". In Germany, the remake charted higher than the ATB original at number six. It was certified gold in Germany and platinum in the UK.

=== Music video ===
The music video for "Your Love (9PM)" was directed by German director Martin Ströter and live premiered YouTube on 25 January 2021, preceded by a live chat with ATB and Topic. The video portrays the two DJs as judges at a dance performance audition. According to ATB, it has a message of unity; he said, "It was important for us to show that we often work better together than alone. Like the two main dancers, who only really harmonise when they dance together."

=== Track listing ===
- Digital download and streaming
1. "Your Love (9PM)" – 2:30
- Digital download and streaming – Tiësto remix
1. "Your Love (9PM)" (Tiësto remix) – 3:06
2. "Your Love (9PM)" – 2:30

=== Personnel ===
- ATB – production, drums, mastering, guitar, bass, synthesizer, programming
- Rudi Dittmann – production, mastering
- Topic – production, drums, mastering, bass, synthesizer, programming
- A7S – vocals, vocal programming

=== Charts ===
==== Weekly charts ====
Weekly chart performance for "Your Love (9PM)"
Chart (2021–2023)	Peak position
Australia (ARIA)	18
Austria (Ö3 Austria Top 40)	8
Belarus Airplay (TopHit)	107
Belgium (Ultratop 50 Flanders)	11
Belgium (Ultratop 50 Wallonia)	22
Bulgaria International (PROPHON)	1
Canada Hot 100 (Billboard)	77
CIS Airplay (TopHit)	1
Croatia International Airplay (Top lista)	3
Czech Republic Airplay (ČNS IFPI)	1
Czech Republic Singles Digital (ČNS IFPI)	18
Denmark (Tracklisten)	23
Estonia Airplay (TopHit)	89
Finland (Suomen virallinen lista)	14
France (SNEP)	40
Germany (GfK)	6
Germany Airplay (BVMI)	1
Global 200 (Billboard)	37
Greece International (IFPI)	10
Hungary (Dance Top 40)	1
Hungary (Rádiós Top 40)	1
Hungary (Single Top 40)	2
Hungary (Stream Top 40)	8
Iceland (Tónlistinn)	32
Ireland (IRMA)	8
Italy (FIMI)	21
Kazakhstan Airplay (TopHit)	38
Lithuania (AGATA)	7
Lithuania Airplay (TopHit)	82
Mexico Airplay (Billboard)	16
Moldova Airplay (TopHit)	38
Netherlands (Dutch Top 40)	7
Netherlands (Single Top 100)	12
New Zealand Hot Singles (RMNZ)	14
Norway (VG-lista)	18
Poland Airplay (ZPAV)	2
Portugal (AFP)	27
Romania (Airplay 100)	2
Russia Airplay (TopHit)	1
Slovakia Airplay (ČNS IFPI)	2
Slovakia Singles Digital (ČNS IFPI)	11
Slovenia (SloTop50)	2
Sweden (Sverigetopplistan)	64
Switzerland (Schweizer Hitparade)	6
Ukraine Airplay (TopHit)	2
UK Singles (Official Charts)	8
UK Dance (Official Charts)	5
US Hot Dance/Electronic Songs (Billboard)	9

==== Monthly charts ====
Monthly chart performance for "Your Love (9PM)"
Chart (2021–2023)	Peak position
CIS Airplay (TopHit)	1
Czech Republic (Rádio – Top 100)	2
Czech Republic (Singles Digitál Top 100)	23
Kazakhstan Airplay (TopHit)	48
Moldova Airplay (TopHit)	42
Romania Airplay (TopHit)	68
Russia Airplay (TopHit)	1
Slovakia (Rádio Top 100)	3
Slovakia (Singles Digitál Top 100)	12
Ukraine Airplay (TopHit)	2

==== Year-end charts ====
2021 year-end chart performance for "Your Love (9PM)"
Chart (2021)	Position
Australia (ARIA)	35
Austria (Ö3 Austria Top 40)	21
Belgium (Ultratop Flanders)	27
Bulgaria Airplay (PROPHON)	8
CIS Airplay (TopHit)	1
Croatia International Airplay (Top lista)	3
Denmark (Tracklisten)	33
France (SNEP)	107
Germany (Official German Charts)	8
Global 200 (Billboard)	112
Hungary (Dance Top 40)	2
Hungary (Rádiós Top 40)	4
Hungary (Single Top 40)	17
Hungary (Stream Top 40)	17
Iceland (Tónlistinn)	88
Ireland (IRMA)	28
Italy (FIMI)	54
Netherlands (Dutch Top 40)	25
Netherlands (Single Top 100)	37
Poland (ZPAV)	6
Portugal (AFP)	44
Russia Airplay (TopHit)	1
Switzerland (Schweizer Hitparade)	15
Ukraine Airplay (TopHit)	4
UK Singles (OCC)	29
US Hot Dance/Electronic Songs (Billboard)	18

2022 year-end chart performance for "Your Love (9PM)"
Chart (2022)	Position
CIS Airplay (TopHit)	39
Hungary (Dance Top 40)	1
Hungary (Rádiós Top 40)	5
Russia Airplay (TopHit)	77
Ukraine Airplay (TopHit)	19

2023 year-end chart performance for "Your Love (9PM)"
Chart (2023)	Position
Belarus Airplay (TopHit)	143
CIS Airplay (TopHit)	75
Hungary (Dance Top 40)	4
Hungary (Rádiós Top 40)	67
Kazakhstan Airplay (TopHit)	65
Moldova Airplay (TopHit)	99
Romania Airplay (TopHit)	107
Russia Airplay (TopHit)	178
Ukraine Airplay (TopHit)	32

2024 year-end chart performance for "Your Love (9PM)"
Chart (2024)	Position
Belarus Airplay (TopHit)	160
CIS Airplay (TopHit)	159
Hungary (Dance Top 40)	3
Lithuania Airplay (TopHit)	150
Romania Airplay (TopHit)	167

2025 year-end chart performance for "Your Love (9PM)"
Chart (2025)	Position
Belarus Airplay (TopHit)	184
Hungary (Dance Top 40)	4
Lithuania Airplay (TopHit)	169
Romania Airplay (TopHit)	199

=== Certifications ===
Sales and certifications for "Your Love (9PM)"
Region	Certification	Certified units/sales
Australia (ARIA)	Platinum	70,000^{‡}
Belgium (BRMA)	Gold	20,000^{‡}
Brazil (Pro-Música Brasil)	3× Platinum	120,000^{‡}
Canada (Music Canada)	2× Platinum	160,000^{‡}
Denmark (IFPI Danmark)	Platinum	90,000^{‡}
France (SNEP)	Platinum	200,000^{‡}
Germany (BVMI)	3× Gold	600,000^{‡}
Italy (FIMI)	2× Platinum	140,000^{‡}
New Zealand (RMNZ)	Platinum	30,000^{‡}
Poland (ZPAV)	2× Platinum	100,000^{‡}
Portugal (AFP)	Platinum	10,000^{‡}
Spain (Promusicae)	Platinum	60,000^{‡}
United Kingdom (BPI)	Platinum	600,000^{‡}
United States (RIAA)	Gold	500,000^{‡}
Streaming
Greece (IFPI Greece)	Platinum	2,000,000^{†}
^{‡} Sales+streaming figures based on certification alone.^{†} Streaming-only figures based on certification alone.
