= Vamos a Marte =

Single by Helene Fischer featuring Luis Fonsi

from the album Rausch
- Language: German; Spanish
- Released: 6 August 2021
- Genre: Pop; Schlager
- Length: 3:23
- Label: Polydor; Island
- Songwriters: Christoph Cronauer; Daniel Cronauer; Eduardo Ruiz; Helene Fischer; José Cano Carrilero; Juan Carlos Arauzo; Konstantin Scherer; Luis Fonsi; Matthias Zürkler; Nico Wellenbrink; Robin Haefs; Vincent Stein
- Producers: B-Case; Beatzarre; Chris Cronauer; Djorkaeff; Fischer (exec.)

Helene Fischer singles chronology
"Regenbogenfarben" (2018)	"Vamos a Marte" (2021)

Luis Fonsi singles chronology
"Bésame" (2021)	"Vamos a Marte" (2021)

Music video
- "Vamos a Marte" on YouTube

"Vamos a Marte" (Spanish pronunciation: [ˈba.mos aˈmaɾ.te]; transl. "Let's Go to Mars") is a song by German singer Helene Fischer featuring Puerto Rican singer Luis Fonsi. It was released on 6 August 2021, as the lead single from her ninth studio album Rausch. The track was written by Fischer and Fonsi, as well as German singer-songwriters Nico Santos and Chris Cronauer, among others, while production was handled by Beatzarre, Djorkaeff, B-Case and Fischer. The song was a top-ten hit in German-speaking countries, including reaching no. 2 in Germany.

== Background ==
Fischer and Fonsi had previously performed together at the Echo Music Prize in 2018. Fischer released the song after having taken a one-year hiatus from the public. She announced the single on her social media on 23 July 2021. The song was released as a celebration of Fischer's 37th birthday on 4 August. About the song, the singer revealed in a clip that she had been waiting a long time to release the song and that there could be no better birthday gift. Fonsi expressed that he felt honoured to have recorded the song with Fischer and that he had never recorded a song in German and Spanish before. The Song reached number 165 in the US Top 200 Single Charts.

== Composition ==
A pop song with notable electronic, Latin and Schlager elements, Fischer and Fonsi take turns at singing in German and Spanish. Lyrically, the song sees the singers trading lines about not having to speak the same language in order to understand each other.

== Music video ==
The music video was released on 6 August 2021. It shows Fischer performing at a space station, while Fonsi is seen partying at a bar. Throughout the video, Fischer is seen dancing in alternating outfits, including a glitter crop top and leather leggins. The video accumulated more than 500,000 views on YouTube in its first 24 hours.

== Track listing ==
Digital single
No.	Title	Length
1.	"Vamos a Marte"	3:23
2.	"Vamos a Marte" (Bachata version)	3:50

== Personnel ==
Credits adapted from Tidal.

- Helene Fischer – songwriting, vocals, production
- Luis Fonsi – songwriting, vocals, recording engineering
- Chris Cronauer – songwriting, background vocals, production, guitar, keyboards, programming
- Daniel Cronauer – songwriting
- Eduardo Ruiz – songwriting
- José Cano Carrilero – songwriting
- Juan Carlos Arauzo – songwriting
- Konstantin Scherer – songwriting, production, programming
- Matthias Zürkler – songwriting, production, bass, drums, keyboards, programming
- Nico Santos – songwriting
- Robin Haefs – songwriting
- Vincent Stein – songwriting, production, programming, mixing
- Laura Morina – mastering engineering
- Sascha Büren – mastering engineering
- Madizin – recording engineering
- Silver Jam – recording engineering

== Charts ==
=== Weekly charts ===
Weekly chart performance for "Vamos a Marte"
Chart (2021)	Peak position
Austria (Ö3 Austria Top 40)	10
Germany (GfK)	2
Switzerland (Schweizer Hitparade)	7

=== Year-end charts ===
Year-end chart performance for "Vamos a Marte"
Chart (2021)	Position
Germany (Official German Charts)	96

== Certifications ==
Region	Certification	Certified units/sales
Austria (IFPI Austria)	Gold	15,000^{‡}
Germany (BVMI)	Gold	200,000^{‡}
^{‡} Sales+streaming figures based on certification alone.
