= Home (Topic song) =

Single by Topic featuring Nico Santos
- Released: December 18, 2015
- Length: 3:26
- Songwriter(s): Daniel Selle; Tobias Topic; Nico Wellenbrink; Matthias Zuerkler
- Producer(s): Topic; Nico Wellenbrink

Topic singles chronology
"Miles" (2015)	"Home" (2015)	"Fly Away" (2015)

Music video
- "Home" on YouTube

"Home" is a single by German DJ Topic featuring German singer-songwriter Nico Santos. The song was a hit in Australia, Germany, and Austria.

== Charts ==
=== Weekly charts ===
Chart (2015–2016)	Peak position
Australia (ARIA)	11
Austria (Ö3 Austria Top 40)	10
Germany (GfK)	12
Sweden Heatseeker (Sverigetopplistan)	2

=== Year-end charts ===
Chart (2016)	Position
Australia (ARIA)	69
Austria (Ö3 Austria Top 40)	64
Germany (Official German Charts)	56

== Certifications ==
Region	Certification	Certified units/sales
Australia (ARIA)	Platinum	70,000^{‡}
Germany (BVMI)	Platinum	400,000^{‡}
^{‡} Sales+streaming figures based on certification alone.
