= Stupid Love (Lady Gaga song) =

2020 single by Lady Gaga

Single by Lady Gaga

from the album Chromatica
- Released: February 28, 2020
- Studio: Conway, MXM, EastWest
- Genre: House; dance-pop; electropop
- Length: 3:13
- Label: Interscope
- Songwriters: Lady Gaga; BloodPop; Max Martin; Martin Joseph Léonard Bresso; Ely Rise
- Producers: BloodPop; Tchami; Max Martin (co.)

Lady Gaga singles chronology
"I'll Never Love Again" (2019)	"Stupid Love" (2020)	"Rain on Me" (2020)

Music video
- "Stupid Love" on YouTube

"Stupid Love" is a song by American singer Lady Gaga, released on February 28, 2020, as the lead single from her sixth studio album, Chromatica (2020), following an earlier leak in January. Written by Gaga, Max Martin, Ely Rise, and producers Tchami and BloodPop, the track marked the beginning of BloodPop's collaboration with Gaga on the album. Musically, it is a house-infused blend of dance-pop and electropop, centered on finding the courage to love again after heartbreak.

The single was promoted through billboards and social media photos, and received many comparisons from critics to Gaga's earlier work. Commercially, "Stupid Love" charted at number one in El Salvador, Hungary, Scotland, and reached the top ten in Australia, Bulgaria, Canada, Croatia, the Czech Republic, Greece, Ireland, Israel, Lebanon, Lithuania, Mexico, Paraguay, Switzerland, the United Kingdom, and the United States. It was also certified diamond in Brazil as well as double-platinum in Australia and Canada.

An accompanying music video was directed by Daniel Askill and released on the same day as the single. It takes place in the fictional world of Chromatica and shows Gaga leading the "Kindness Punks", performing choreography with groups of dance warriors, each group with a corresponding color. "Stupid Love" was also featured in a lip sync video, promoting Gaga's Haus Laboratories eyeshadow palette named after the track. The song received various remix edits, including one by Coucou Chloe on the remix album, Dawn of Chromatica (2021). Gaga performed "Stupid Love" at the 2020 MTV Video Music Awards, The Chromatica Ball concert tour (2022), and the 2023 dates of her Jazz & Piano residency.

== Recording and composition ==
"Stupid Love" was written for Lady Gaga's sixth studio album, Chromatica (2020) by Gaga with the help of BloodPop, Tchami, Max Martin, and Ely Rise; BloodPop and Tchami also served as the track's producers. According to BloodPop, he first played the instrumental of the song to Gaga at the Kansas City, Missouri stop of her Joanne World Tour while they were working on songs for the soundtrack to the 2018 movie A Star Is Born, in which she appeared as the lead. While none of those songs made the soundtrack, working together on "Stupid Love" was fruitful and convinced BloodPop into committing to co-produce Gaga's entire album.

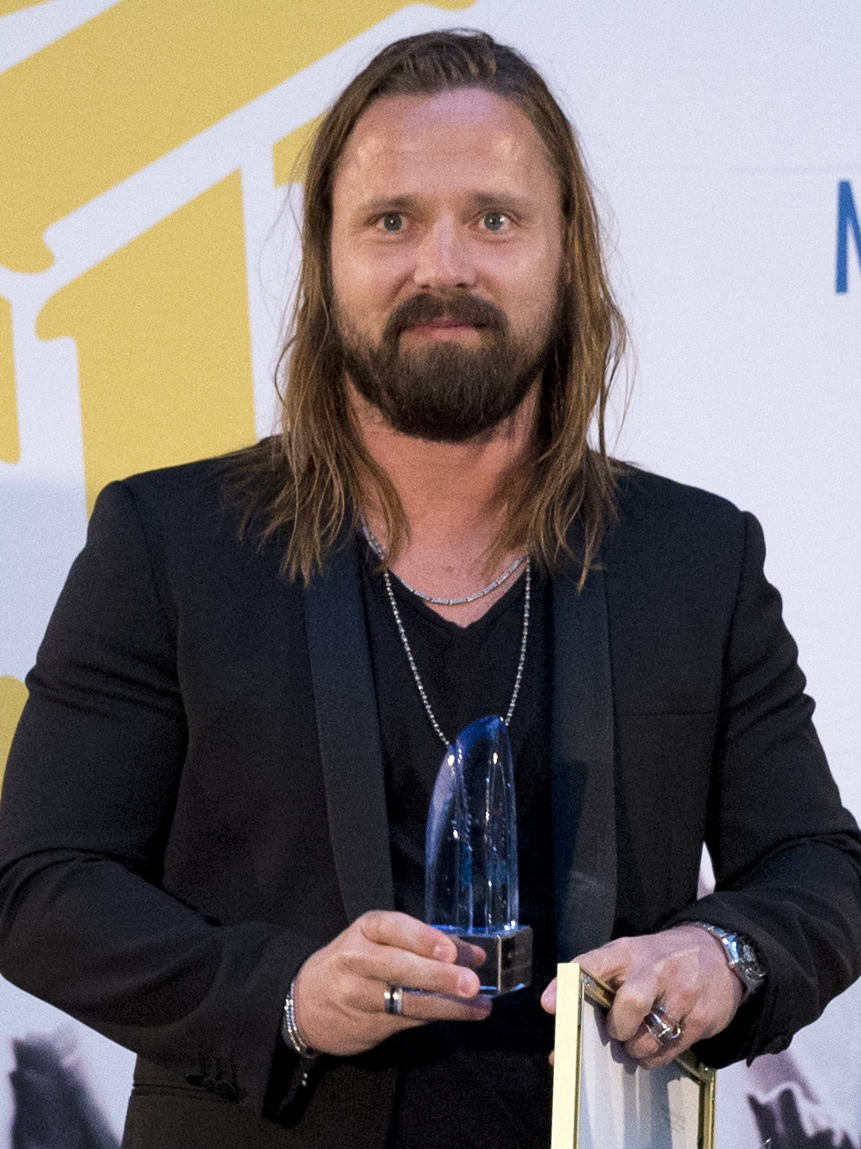
"Stupid Love" marks the first time Lady Gaga collaborated with Max Martin.

BloodPop felt the demo of the song "was missing something", and he credits Max Martin with having "some fantastic ideas that really elevated it". The track marks the first time Gaga worked with Martin. Gaga admitted she was at first hesitant to work with Martin, as she likes to write and produce on her own terms, but "decided to stop being an asshole" and meet him. She explained: "Basically, I sang over a track that BloodPop made. We sent over what I sang to Max, Max picked some parts out, sent it back to me, and then I wrote lyrics. I warmed up my voice, got in the booth, I sang it, and what you're hearing on 'Stupid Love' is what we did that day."

"Stupid Love" has been described as a return to the dance-pop, electropop and house sound of Gaga's earlier career, with influences of dance, disco, and electronic. Dan Adler of Vanity Fair noted "Lady Gaga's new single 'Stupid Love' arrives in declarations: 'All I ever wanted was love;' 'I want your stupid love.' She issues them over glittering dance pop, and they're less plaintive than euphoric—the act of expression is the triumph." The song is composed in the key of B♭ Mixolydian and is played at a tempo of 118 beats per minute. Gaga's vocals span from A♭_{3} to F_{5} in the song. The lyrics talk about the "joyful foolishness of loving someone" and gathering the courage to fall in love again after a heartbreak. The Daily Beast's Kevin Fallon opined that in contrast with the rest of Chromatica, the track "almost entirely rejects a search for deep meaning." Explaining the song's background, Gaga further elaborated: "...When we all decide to be vulnerable [...] it's very scary for a lot of people and there's all kinds of laws and constructs and things that have built all around us... I'd love for it to collapse as many of those walls as possible and people to be saying, 'I want your Stupid Love. I love you.'"

== Release and promotion ==
Clips of the song first leaked online in January 2020, shortly followed by the entire track leaking. The song went viral on Twitter. Gaga responded to the leak by tweeting "can y'all stop" with a stock photo of a young girl wearing a balaclava while listening to music on a cassette player. Gaga did not perform "Stupid Love" during her AT&T TV Super Saturday Night pre-Super Bowl LIV show in Miami, Florida, despite requests from audience members. Instead, Gaga performed her Enigma set from her residency in Las Vegas and did not address the leaked track. Online chatter of the song began as early as October 30, 2019, when Gaga posted a picture to her Twitter of a Halloween pumpkin she painted. In the corner of the photo was an iPod Touch; when zoomed in it appeared to show "Stupid Love" being played on the device.

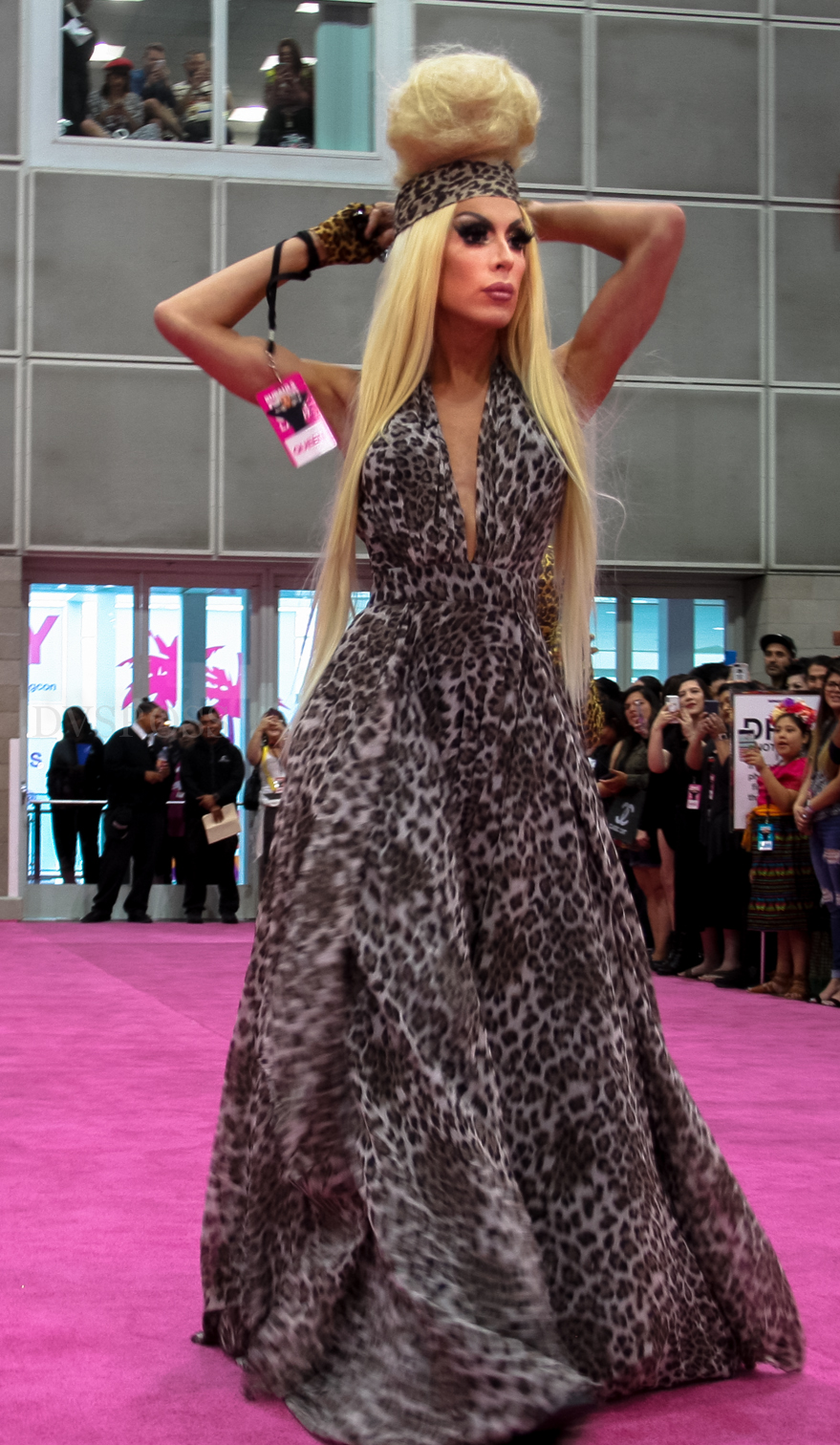
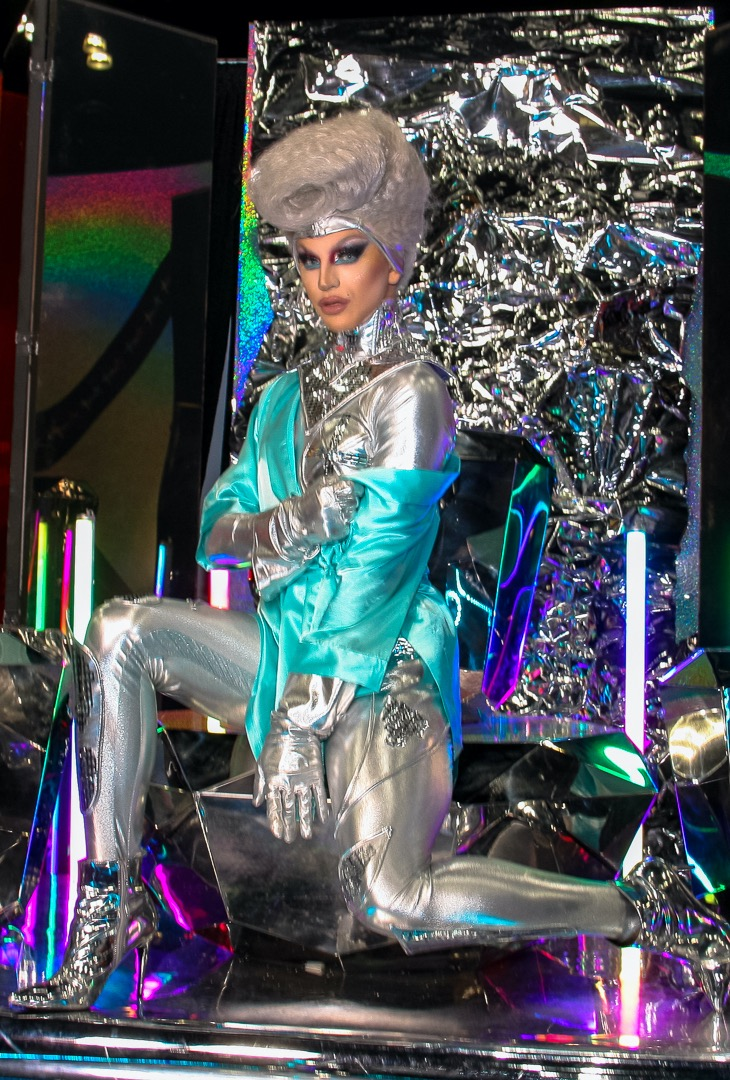
In May 2020, a 'lip sync' video was released for the song, promoting Gaga's Haus Laboratories eyeshadow palette named after "Stupid Love", featuring drag performers Alaska (left) and Aquaria (right).

Gaga announced the song's release via social media on February 25, 2020. After the song leaked, she and her manager had a discussion if they should choose another song for the lead single, even though they spent months developing the music video and its choreography; they decided to go with the original plan. She explained: "...The song, when it's mixed, mastered and finished with the visuals, and everything I have to say about it — when all those things come together at once, that will be the art piece I'm making. Not a leak." The announcement of the single was accompanied with a photograph of a billboard in Los Angeles that had the song's title "splashed across an image of bright pink lips." The billboard also featured stills from the music video and a silhouette of characters in the video ingrained in the text. Chromatica is written twice on the billboard: once vertically adjacent to the music video stills, and again as the last line of the copyright message in the lower left corner. The prominence of the word led news outlets to speculate Chromatica as the title of Gaga's sixth studio album.

Jeena Sharma of Paper described promotional images of Gaga for "Stupid Love" as "pop-meets-punk". The images featured Gaga wearing a pink monochromatic look with makeup from her Haus Laboratories beauty line. Just before dropping "Stupid Love" and its music video, Gaga tweeted "Earth is cancelled". In the hours after its release, both the song "Stupid Love" and Lady Gaga herself were the top two trending topics on Twitter worldwide. The song was placed at the top of Apple Music's Today's Top Hits playlist, Spotify's New Music Daily playlist, and Spotify's Today's Hits playlist. On May 18, 2020, a lip sync video was released for the song, promoting Gaga's Haus Laboratories eyeshadow palette named after "Stupid Love". The video features influencers from the world of makeup, including drag performers Alaska and Aquaria.

== Critical reception ==
Many music critics highlighted how "Stupid Love" returned to Lady Gaga's dance-pop roots. Early responses to the leak described the track as energetic and aligned with her signature sound. Kyle Munzenrieder of W called it "classic Gaga with a chugging power chorus and a big-room backing track," while Erica Gonzales of Harper's Bazaar labeled the leaked version an "upbeat cut with big vocals" that seemed poised for radio success. Variety's Alex Stedman similarly viewed it as a "disco-infused anthem" reminiscent of the Born This Way era.

"Stupid Love"
An excerpt of "Stupid Love", showcasing the disco-infused production, chugging power-chorus, and maximalist electropop sound, reflecting critics' view of the track as a return to Gaga's dance-pop roots.

Upon the song's official release, several critics compared it to Gaga's earlier catalog. Michael Cuby of Nylon felt it blended elements of "Bad Kids" and "The Edge of Glory," and said its beat recalls the "joyous electropop" of "Do What U Want". Pitchfork's Jamieson Cox also drew comparisons to that song, describing "Stupid Love" as "brawny, shiny disco" and suggesting it channels Gaga's late-2000s spirit "without achieving the same kind of grandeur." Still, he welcomed the return of what he called the "goofy, indomitable spirit that made her so refreshing in the first place." DIY's Sarah Jameson praised the track's "maximalist addictiveness", while writers at Rolling Stone and Consequence referred to it as a "dance jam" and an "electronic disco banger," respectively.

Some reviewers highlighted Gaga's vocals and the clarity of the production. Spencer Kornhaber of The Atlantic deemed the single a "glorious comeback," calling it a return to form for both Gaga and the genre. He noted that although Max Martin's production is "perfectly calibrated for catchiness," Gaga's voice ensures "a sense of humanity remains intact," and he praised the track's arrangement, including the brief fake-out before the final chorus. Billboard's Stephen Daw similarly remarked that the song "offers spine-tingling pop euphoria" and pointed to the "unbridled joy" in her performance.

More reserved assessments came from Slant Magazine, where Alexa Camp described the song as a "catchy but uninventive slice of electro-pop," again noting its similarities to "Do What U Want." The Guardian's Michael Cragg called it "fun and dumb," while The Independent's Adam White argued that although "Stupid Love" is "propulsive and pleasurable", Gaga can "do this sound in her sleep."

The track made its way onto several best-of-2020 lists. Consequence placed it sixth overall, praising it as "a perfect pop song" and "exactly what we've wanted from Lady Gaga for a long, long time." Rolling Stone's Kory Grow ranked it 16th, noting that Gaga "sounds like she's genuinely having fun again," while Billboard placed it at 31, calling it "a boost of good vibes this year."

== Commercial performance ==
In the United States, "Stupid Love" debuted at number five on the Billboard Hot 100, becoming Gaga's sixteenth top-ten hit and her highest-charting debut since "The Edge of Glory" entered at number three in 2011. It also marked her first top-ten debut since "Dope" opened at number eight in 2013, and her first top-ten hit since "Shallow" reached number one in 2019. With "Stupid Love", Gaga became the fifth artist to appear in the Hot 100's top ten in the 2000s, 2010s, and 2020s following Mariah Carey, Drake, Eminem, and Maroon 5. The song opened atop Digital Songs with 53,000 downloads, becoming her seventh number one on that chart. It also debuted at number one on Hot Hot Dance/Electronic Songs, becoming her fifth leader and twenty-eighth entry on the ranking. "Stupid Love" fell to number 30 on the Hot 100 in its second week and remained on the chart for ten weeks in total. In Canada, the song debuted and peaked at number seven on the Canadian Hot 100. The song was certified double platinum by Music Canada for selling over 160,000 units.

"Stupid Love" debuted at number seven in Australia and number 23 in New Zealand, which became its peak in both regions. It was present for seven weeks on the former nation's chart, while in New Zealand it dropped off after two weeks. The Official Charts Company reported that the song was challenging for the UK number one based on preliminary sales and early streaming data. After two days of downloads and streams, it trailed The Weeknd's "Blinding Lights" by just under 1,200 chart sales. "Stupid Love" later debuted at number five on the UK Singles Chart, becoming Gaga's thirteenth top-ten entry in the region. It was certified Platinum by the British Phonographic Industry (BPI) for 600,000 copies of streaming equivalent units. In Ireland, "Stupid Love" debuted at number six as the week's highest new entry and most downloaded track of the week; it also became her fifteenth top 10 in the country.

Elsewhere, "Stupid Love"'s highest position was attained in Scotland, Hungary, and El Salvador, where it reached the top of the charts. The song also reached the top ten in Bulgaria, Croatia, Czech Republic, Greece, Ireland, Israel, Lebanon, Mexico and Paraguay, top twenty in Slovakia, Austria, Panama, Italy, Ecuador, Finland, and Belgium, top thirty in Germany, Portugal, Norway and Sweden and top forty in Argentina and France.

== Music video ==
=== Concept and development ===
The video was filmed on January 24, 2020. It was directed by Daniel Askill and filmed on location at Trona Pinnacles in California. It was filmed entirely using Apple's iPhone 11 Pro triple camera system, with Askill saying that by not relying on "bigger, much more expensive cameras", they had "lot of new possibilities and freedoms [...] to explore". The iPhones were mounted on drones and Steadicams, and the Filmic Pro app was used for capturing footage.

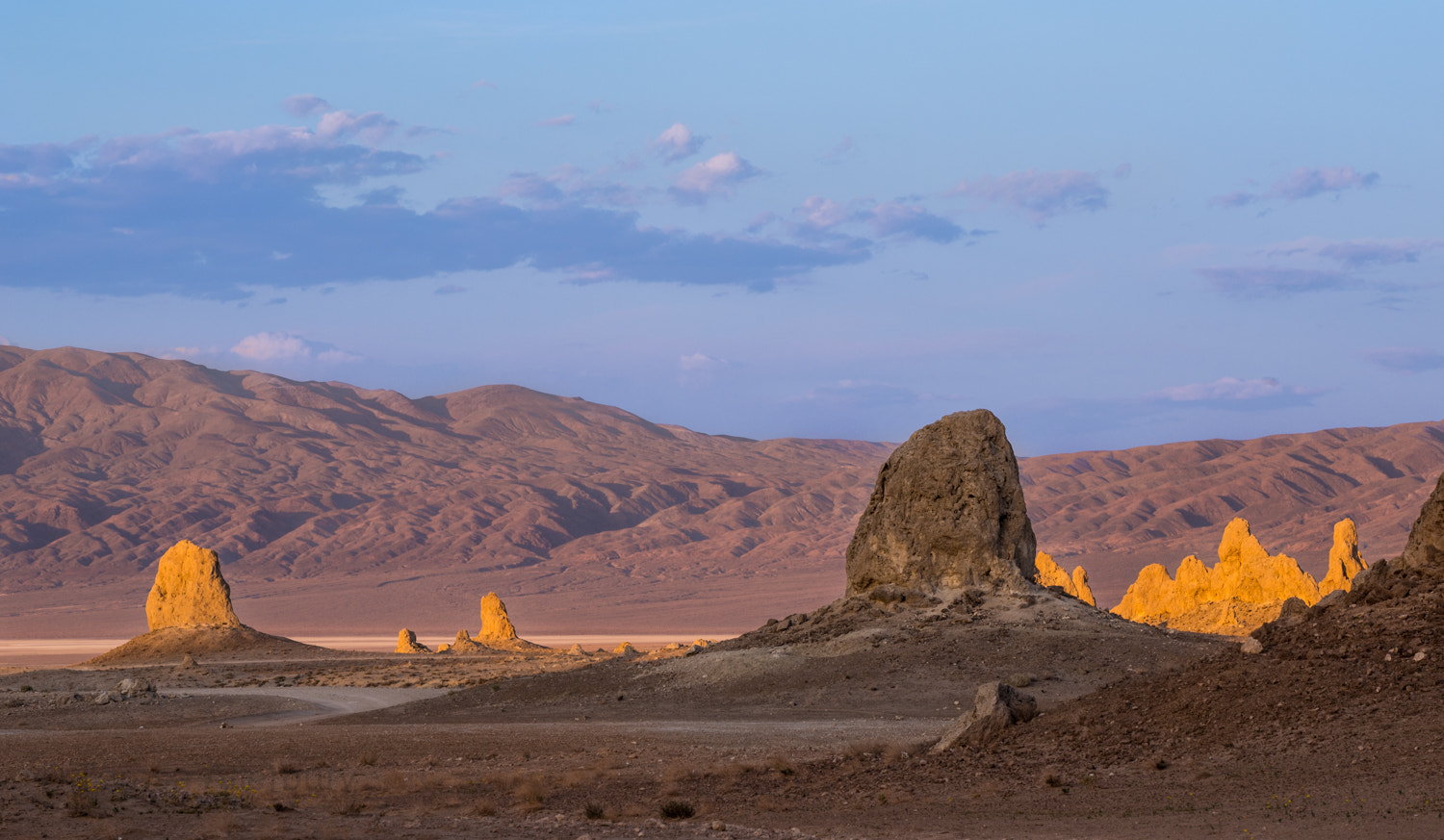
Trona Pinnacles, the filming location of the music video

The main concept of the clip was bringing different kinds of people together under music and dance. It is represented with separate groups of dancers, each forming a unique tribe with a corresponding color and logo – according to Gaga, they are the "Kindness Punks" in pink, the "Freedom Fighters" in blue, the "Junkyard Scavengers" in black, the "Government Officials" in red, the "Eco Warriors" in green, and the "Cyber Kids" in yellow. The video's choreographer, Richy Jackson, auditioned roughly a thousand dancers in Los Angeles for the video, aiming for a cast that reflected a broad range of backgrounds and styles. To emphasize the individuality of each tribe, he developed distinct movement vocabularies for them. Jackson said the black-leather group naturally lent itself to hip-hop–influenced choreography, while the yellow tribe's tech-focused aesthetic suggested more angular, abstract movement. He described the green tribe as resembling a miniature "house" within the larger narrative, so he gave them a voguing style. The red and blue tribes were conceived as the most powerful factions, and their choreography was shaped to convey unwavering strength and confrontation. He added that the use of sign language for Gaga's own tribe was his idea, inspired by the lyric "All I ever wanted was love!", which he felt required more than dance alone to express fully.

In a Harper's Bazaar interview with Sarah Tanno, Gaga's makeup artist, Tanno described incorporating armor-like elements to reflect Gaga's desire project strength in the video. Explaining Gaga's vision, Tanno said she wanted to embody a "Kindness Punk", someone who champions kindness and leads with love. Tanno also drew inspiration from earlier points in Gaga's career when designing the facial pieces, recalling Gaga's cheek prosthetics from the Born This Way era and seeking a new, distinctive element for "Stupid Love". She opted for materials resembling bone prosthetics rather than metal so the pieces would move naturally as Gaga danced. Unlike the facial pieces, Gaga's costumes featured actual metal elements created by designer Laurel DeWitt. She explained that the creative direction blended futuristic armor, alien motifs, and insect-like references, all rendered in pink to match the video's aesthetic. DeWitt said Gaga loved the final looks, even if some were uncomfortable to wear, remarking that "you know Gaga, anything for fashion."

In her Apple Music interview with Zane Lowe, Gaga explained that the confrontation between the red and blue groups in the "Stupid Love" video can be read as political, reflecting how polarized and tense she feels the world has become. She said this sense of division informed her broader vision for Chromatica, noting that it is "neither dystopian nor utopian", but rather her way of making sense of a reality shaped by extremes—something she hopes listeners can connect with.

=== Synopsis and reception ===
Gaga, surrounded by her dancers, performing in pink face armor and headpiece in the music video. The Independent found this look to be inspired by Power Rangers and the Alien films.

The video debuted online and on MTV on February 28, 2020, with teasers being released one day prior. It opens with the text "The world rots in conflict. Many tribes battle for dominance. While the Spiritual ones pray and sleep for peace, the Kindness punks fight for Chromatica." The camera pans to a desert scene with crystal mountains, on the fictional planet Chromatica. Gaga and her squad are running to the scene of a battle. The singer is seen in various hot pink outfits dancing it out with groups of dance warriors. Once the factions begin to fight again, Gaga cannot take it anymore. She levitates two fighters and slams them back to the ground; with that move, the battle is won. Gaga leads the dance warriors into one big celebration to conclude the video. The faction in pink, led by Gaga, restored peace to the desert region.

The music video was widely noted for its colorful, maximalist aesthetic and references to Gaga's earlier visual eras. British Vogue described Gaga as a "Y2K-inspired desert warrior" and viewed the video's styling as a return to her "meat-dress-era form." Esquire highlighted the choreography as a re-embrace of Gaga's signature gestural movements, noting the return of classic poses such as "wrists on forehead" and "forearms in x formation."

Many critics commented on the video's dense visuals and pop-culture influences. Vulture called it a work of "purposeful visual overkill," comparing elements of the production to Grimes's "Genesis", the video game Bayonetta, and vintage Star Trek. Paper said the video's vibrant, desert-set world evokes Mad Max, mixing "Bad Romance"-era choreography with Artpop's camp sensibility, and contrasted this bright palette with the darker visuals of A Star Is Born. The fashion and costume design also drew attention, with The Independent praising the "outlandish" outfits, calling the fashion "as idiosyncratic and fabulous as Gaga herself," and noted possible inspirations from Power Rangers and the Alien franchise.

Some reviewers were more critical, with Slant Magazine calling the video corny and lacking the narrative sophistication of earlier works like 2011's "Born This Way" while PinkNews likewise deemed it "somewhat-lacking."

== Live performances ==
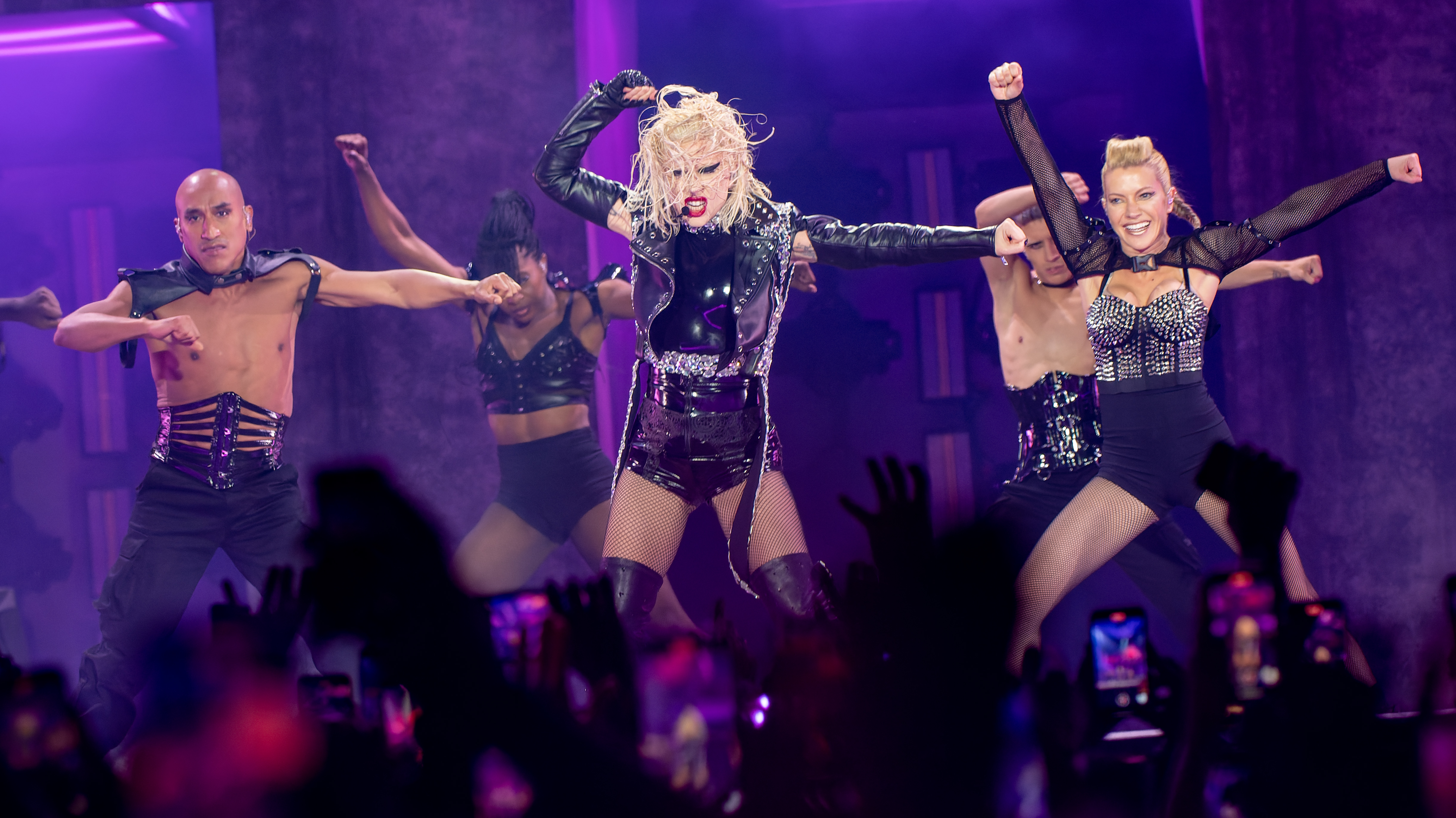
Gaga performing "Stupid Love" during The Chromatica Ball, 2022

On August 30, 2020, Gaga performed "Stupid Love" as the final number of a medley of songs from Chromatica at the 2020 MTV Video Music Awards. She started the performance with a stripped-down rendition of the track, playing on a brain-shaped piano. She then gave a short speech about the importance of being kind and wearing a face mask due to the ongoing COVID-19 pandemic. After being joined by her dancers on stage, she continued with a live band version of "Stupid Love". Gaga was wearing a pink bodysuit and a sound-reactive LED mask for the gig. Billboard highlighted the performance of "Stupid Love" as "a surprising standout", where Gaga showcased her "raw vocals" while playing the piano, before turning the song "into the dance-ready ball that Chromatica is all about."

In 2022, Gaga performed an extended version of "Stupid Love" at The Chromatica Ball stadium tour, where it was part of the finale to the show. She was wearing a crystal-embellished latex bodysuit and leather biker jacket by Alexander McQueen, along with leather biker boots worn over black fishnet stockings. David Cobbald of The Line of Best Fit noted that Gaga "doesn’t falter her choreography for the sweat-rinsed hair in her face...", while Lauren O'Neill from i said Gaga "played 'Stupid Love', dancing the choreography with the abandon that has always characterised her live show." In the 2023 dates of her Jazz & Piano residency in Las Vegas, Gaga performed a soul-pop version of "Stupid Love" on the piano. For Rebekah Gonzalez at Z100 New York, the rendition sounded like something from Stevie Wonder's Songs in the Key of Life (1976).

== Remixes ==
On May 15, 2020, the Vitaclub Warehouse Mix of "Stupid Love" was released, produced by BloodPop and Burns. The remix leans more heavily into club music than the original, emphasizing its vocal chops over a driving four-on-the-floor house beat. The track later appeared on the Target and international deluxe edition of Chromatica. The Japanese version of Chromatica also includes the Ellis remix of "Stupid Love" as a bonus track.

For Gaga's third remix album, Dawn of Chromatica (2021), French producer Coucou Chloe reshaped "Stupid Love" into a darker, more shadowy club track, replacing the original's bright pop production with a moodier, "macabre midnight romp". In his review of Dawn of Chromatica, Robin Murray from Clash called Coucou's "Stupid Love" remix, along with Lsdxoxo's take on "Alice", "dancefloor bumpers". Alexa Camp of Slant Magazine dismissed the remix, saying that "Stupid Love" was stripped "of its ingratiating hook".

== Track listing ==
Digital download and streaming

1. "Stupid Love" – 3:13

7"/cassette/CD

1. "Stupid Love" – 3:13
2. "Stupid Love" (instrumental) – 3:13

Digital download and streaming (Vitaclub Warehouse Mix)

1. "Stupid Love" (Vitaclub Warehouse Mix) [featuring Vitaclub] – 3:40

== Credits and personnel ==
Credits adapted from the liner notes of Chromatica.

=== Studios ===
- Conway Recording Studios (recording)
- MXM Studios (recording)
- EastWest Studios (recording)
- Sterling Sound (mixing)

=== Personnel ===
- Lady Gaga – vocals, songwriter
- BloodPop – producer, songwriter, bass, drums, guitar, keyboards, percussion, programming
- Tchami – producer, songwriter, mixer, bass, drums, guitar, keyboards, percussion programming
- Max Martin – co-producer, songwriter, vocal producer (Note: Max Martin is also credited as a producer in the Vitaclub Warehouse mix version.)
- Ely Rise – songwriter
- Benjamin Rice – vocal producer, mixer, recording engineer
- Tom Norris – mixer
- E. Scott Kelly – assistant mixer
- John Robinson – drums

== Charts ==
=== Weekly charts ===
Weekly chart performance for "Stupid Love"
Chart (2020)	Peak position
Argentina Hot 100 (Billboard)	31
Australia (ARIA)	7
Austria (Ö3 Austria Top 40)	17
Belgium (Ultratop 50 Flanders)	20
Belgium (Ultratop 50 Wallonia)	12
Bolivia (Monitor Latino)	16
Bulgaria Airplay (PROPHON)	9
Canada Hot 100 (Billboard)	7
Canada AC (Billboard)	16
Canada CHR/Top 40 (Billboard)	9
Canada Hot AC (Billboard)	5
Costa Rica (Monitor Latino)	11
Croatia International Airplay (Top lista)	2
Czech Republic Airplay (ČNS IFPI)	7
Czech Republic Singles Digital (ČNS IFPI)	7
Ecuador (National-Report)	15
El Salvador (Monitor Latino)	1
Estonia (Eesti Tipp-40)	11
Euro Digital Song Sales (Billboard)	1
Finland (Suomen virallinen lista)	14
France (SNEP)	36
Germany (GfK)	21
Greece International (IFPI)	10
Hungary (Rádiós Top 40)	2
Hungary (Single Top 40)	1
Hungary (Stream Top 40)	7
Ireland (IRMA)	6
Israel International Airplay (Media Forest)	8
Italy (FIMI)	15
Italy Airplay (EarOne)	1
Japan Hot 100 (Billboard)	48
Lebanon Airplay (Lebanese Top 20)	6
Lithuania (AGATA)	9
Mexico (Billboard Mexican Airplay)	8
Netherlands (Single Top 100)	56
New Zealand (Recorded Music NZ)	23
Norway (VG-lista)	22
Panama (Monitor Latino)	17
Paraguay (Monitor Latino)	8
Poland Airplay (ZPAV)	51
Portugal (AFP)	23
Scottish Singles Sales (Official Charts)	1
Singapore (RIAS)	20
Slovakia Airplay (ČNS IFPI)	11
Slovakia Singles Digital (ČNS IFPI)	13
Russia Airplay (TopHit)	191
Spain (Promusicae)	50
Sweden (Sverigetopplistan)	24
Switzerland (Schweizer Hitparade)	6
UK Singles (Official Charts)	5
US Billboard Hot 100	5
US Adult Contemporary (Billboard)	18
US Adult Pop Airplay (Billboard)	8
US Dance Club Songs (Billboard)	14
US Hot Dance/Electronic Songs (Billboard)	1
US Dance Airplay (Billboard)	8
US Pop Airplay (Billboard)	11
US Rolling Stone Top 100	4
Venezuela (Record Report)	39

Weekly chart performance for "Stupid Love (Coucou Chloe remix)"
Chart (2021)	Peak position
US Hot Dance/Electronic Songs (Billboard)	27

=== Monthly charts ===
Monthly chart performance for "Stupid Love"
Chart (2020)	Peak position
Brazil Streaming (Pro-Música Brasil)	33
Paraguay (SGP)	35
Slovenia (SloTop50)	6

=== Year-end charts ===
2020 year-end chart performance for "Stupid Love"
Chart (2020)	Position
Argentina Airplay (Monitor Latino)	18
Belgium (Ultratop Wallonia)	75
Bolivia (Monitor Latino)	91
Canada (Canadian Hot 100)	59
Chile (Monitor Latino)	67
Croatia (HRT)	21
El Salvador (Monitor Latino)	32
Honduras (Monitor Latino)	72
Hungary (Rádiós Top 40)	20
Hungary (Single Top 40)	43
Paraguay (Monitor Latino)	53
Slovenia (SloTop50)	39
UK Singles (OCC)	98
US Adult Contemporary (Billboard)	49
US Adult Top 40 (Billboard)	34
US Hot Dance/Electronic Songs (Billboard)	6

2021 year-end chart performance for "Stupid Love"
Chart (2021)	Position
Hungary (Rádiós Top 40)	52

== Certifications ==
Certifications for "Stupid Love"
Region	Certification	Certified units/sales
Australia (ARIA)	2× Platinum	140,000^{‡}
Austria (IFPI Austria)	Gold	15,000^{‡}
Brazil (Pro-Música Brasil)	Diamond	160,000^{‡}
Canada (Music Canada)	2× Platinum	160,000^{‡}
France (SNEP)	Platinum	200,000^{‡}
Italy (FIMI)	Gold	35,000^{‡}
New Zealand (RMNZ)	Platinum	30,000^{‡}
Norway (IFPI Norway)	Gold	30,000^{‡}
Poland (ZPAV)	Platinum	50,000^{‡}
Portugal (AFP)	Gold	5,000^{‡}
Spain (Promusicae)	Gold	30,000^{‡}
United Kingdom (BPI)	Platinum	600,000^{‡}
United States (RIAA)	Platinum	1,000,000^{‡}
^{‡} Sales+streaming figures based on certification alone.

== Release history ==
Release dates and formats for "Stupid Love"
Region	Date	Format(s)	Version	Label	Ref.
Various	February 28, 2020	Cassette; CD; digital download; streaming; vinyl	Original	Interscope	
Italy	February 28, 2020	Radio airplay	Original	Universal	
United States	March 2, 2020	Adult contemporary radio; hot adult contemporary radio; modern adult contemporary radio	Original	Interscope	
United States	March 3, 2020	Contemporary hit radio	Original	Interscope	
Various	May 15, 2020	Digital download; streaming	Vitaclub Warehouse mix	Interscope	

== See also ==
- List of Billboard Digital Song Sales number ones of 2020
- List of Billboard Hot 100 top-ten singles in 2020
- List of German airplay number-one songs of 2020
- List of top 10 singles in 2020 (Ireland)
- List of UK Singles Sales Chart number ones
- List of UK top-ten singles in 2020
