= Chain My Heart =

2021 single by Topic and Bebe Rexha

Single by Topic and Bebe Rexha
- Released: 11 June 2021
- Genre: Deep house
- Length: 2:26
- Label: Virgin
- Songwriter(s): Bleta Rexha; Alexander Tidebrink; Tobias Topic; Petter Tarland
- Producer(s): Tobias Topic

Topic singles chronology
"Your Love (9PM)" (2021)	"Chain My Heart" (2021)	"Drive" (2021)

Bebe Rexha singles chronology
"Die for a Man" (2021)	"Chain My Heart" (2021)	"Family" (2021)

Music video
- "Chain My Heart" on YouTube

"Chain My Heart" is a song by German producer Topic and American singer Bebe Rexha. It was released as a single on 11 June 2021 by Virgin Records.

== Background ==
Topic said in an interview with Popjuice that he began working on the track in summer 2020 in Stockholm with A7S, before sending it to Rexha, who started working on it remotely.

== Content ==
Rexha said in a statement, "'Chain My Heart' is about finding somebody that truly captivates your heart, and not wanting to let them go."

== Music video ==
The official music video was uploaded on 13 July 2021, and it was directed by Jason Lester. It shows Topic and Rexha with a group of "leather-clad dancers" through an industrial Los Angeles location. The video was also noted to feature a "nod to 80s videos and action films and a wink to Berlin nightlife".

== Charts ==
=== Weekly charts ===
Weekly chart performance for "Chain My Heart"
Chart (2021)	Peak position
Germany (GfK)	100
Hungary (Rádiós Top 40)	15
San Marino (SMRRTV Top 50)	25
Slovakia (Rádio Top 100)	41
Sweden Heatseeker (Sverigetopplistan)	18
US Hot Dance/Electronic Songs (Billboard)	16

=== Year-end charts ===
Year-end chart performance for "Chain My Heart"
Chart (2021)	Position
US Hot Dance/Electronic Songs (Billboard)	63

== Certifications ==
Certifications for "Chain My Heart"
Region	Certification	Certified units/sales
Brazil (Pro-Música Brasil)	Gold	20,000^{‡}
^{‡} Sales+streaming figures based on certification alone.

== Release history ==
Release history for "Chain My Heart"
Region	Date	Format	Label	Ref.
Various	11 June 2021	Digital download; streaming	Virgin	
