= Lost (Samra song) =

2020 single by Samra x Topic

Single by Samra x Topic
- Released: 10 December 2020
- Length: 2:20
- Label: Urban; Cataleya
- Songwriters: Hussein Akkouche; Greckoe; Marco Minella; Christoph Thesen; Tobias Topic

Samra singles chronology
"Kennst du das ?!" (2020)	"Lost" (2020)	"Goldjunge" (2021)

Topic singles chronology
"Why Do You Lie to Me" (2020)	"Lost" (2020)	"Your Love (9PM)" (2021)

"Lost" is a song by German rapper Samra and German producer Topic. It was released on 10 December 2020 and has peaked at number 3 on the German charts.

== Charts ==
=== Weekly charts ===
Weekly chart performance for "Lost"
Chart (2020–2021)	Peak position
Austria (Ö3 Austria Top 40)	7
Germany (GfK)	3
Switzerland (Schweizer Hitparade)	8

=== Year-end charts ===
Year-end chart performance for "Lost"
Chart (2021)	Position
Germany (Official German Charts)	53
