= Nico Santos (singer) =

German singer-songwriter

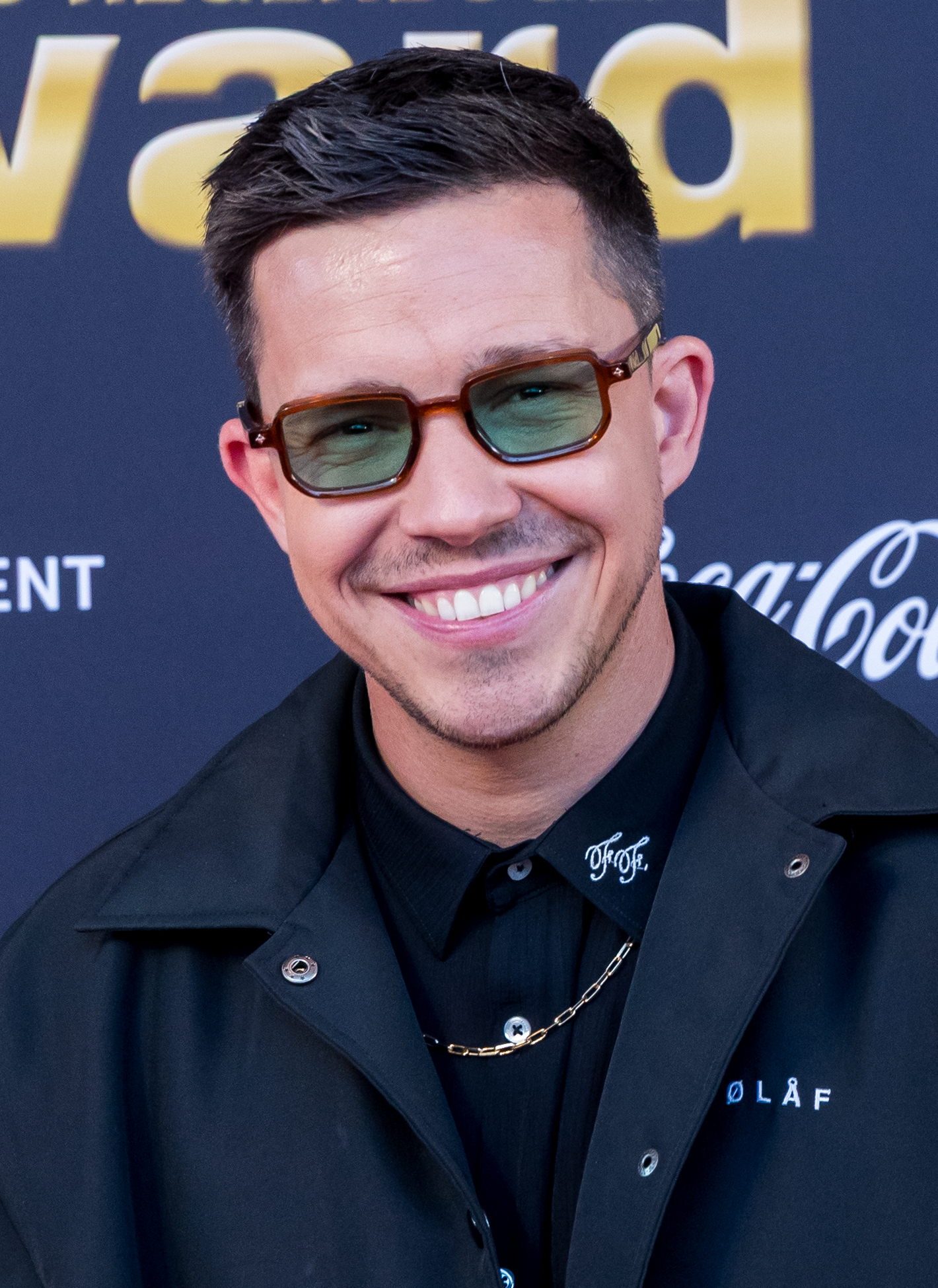
- Santos in 2025

Background information
- Also known as: Santos; Santi
- Born: Nico Wellenbrink; 7 January 1993 (age 33); Bremen, Germany
- Genres: Pop, R&B, Dance-Pop, Electropop, Hip Hop
- Occupation: Singer-songwriter
- Label: Universal
- Website: www.nico-santos.de

Nico Wellenbrink (born 7 January 1993), better known as Nico Santos or occasionally as Santos or Santi, is a German singer-songwriter. In 2017, after having been featured on Topic's hit "Home" (2015), he released his breakthrough solo single "Rooftop", which reached the top five in German-speaking Europe, Poland and Slovakia, as well as number one in the Czech Republic. It also received several certifications, including triple gold by the German Bundesverband Musikindustrie (BVMI) and quintuple platinum by the International Federation of the Phonographic Industry Switzerland (IFPI SWI). Santos' debut studio album, Streets of Gold, was issued in October 2018 and yielded other moderately successful singles alongside "Rooftop", such as "Safe" (2018) and "Unforgettable" (2019).

In May 2020, Universal Music Group released his self-titled second record, which fared well commercially and featured three top 40 hits on the German singles chart—"Better" (2019), "Play with Fire" (2019) and "Like I Love You" (2020). While the former was a collaboration with Lena Meyer-Landrut and the latter with Topic, respectively, "Play with Fire" notably reached number 11 in the Czech Republic. Another top 10, "Would I Lie to You", followed in 2021 in the territory, the same year as Santos released the single "Leere Hände" ("Empty Hands") to great commercial success in German-speaking Europe under his last name only. Santos collaborated again with Topic in 2022 on "In Your Arms (For an Angel)", which was listed on Billboard's Euro Digital Singles Sales and Hot Dance/Electronic Songs charts, among others.

Apart from his solo releases, Santos has co-written or produced songs for a number of German artists, including Bushido, Shindy, Helene Fischer and Mark Forster. His visibility was aided by his participation in the German international song competition Free European Song Contest 2020, which he won with the song "Like I Love You", as well as by his involvement as a coach on The Voice of Germany (2019–2021, 2025–present). Santos was the winning coach on the fifteenth season when his team member Anne Mosters won the season.

== Discography ==
=== Studio albums ===
Title	Details	Peak chart positions			Certifications
Title	Details	GER	AUT	SWI	Certifications
Streets of Gold	Released: 12 October 2018; Label: Universal Music Group; Formats: Digital download, streaming	25	69	29	IFPI SWI: Platinum
Nico Santos	Released: 8 May 2020; Label: Universal Music Group; Formats: Digital download, streaming	3	5	2	
Ride	Released: 26 May 2023; Label: Universal Music Group; Formats: Digital download, streaming	2	42	37	
Santos (as Santos)	Released: 16 October 2025; Label: Universal Music Group; Formats: Digital download, streaming	13	—	30	
POV	Released: 30 October 2026; Label: Universal Music Group; Formats: Digital download, streaming	1	8	19	

=== Singles ===
==== As lead artist ====
Title	Year	Peak chart positions										Certifications	Album
Title	Year	GER	AUT	CRO	CZR	EUR Dig.	POL	RUS	SVK	SWI	US Dance/ Elec.	Certifications	Album
"Symphony" (featuring B-Case)	2016	—	—	—	—	—	—	—	—	—	—		Non-album singles
"Goodbye to Love" (with Broiler)	2017	—	—	—	—	—	—	—	—	—	—		Non-album singles
"Rooftop" (solo or featuring Kool Savas and Kelvin Jones)	2017	5	2	—	1	—	3	—	4	5	—	BVMI: 3× Gold; IFPI AUT: Platinum; IFPI SWI: 5× Platinum	Streets of Gold
"Safe"	2018	24	23	—	—	—	—	—	—	36	—	BVMI: Gold; IFPI AUT: Gold; IFPI SWI: 2× Platinum	Streets of Gold
"Oh Hello"	2018	— (Note: "Oh Hello" did not enter the Official German Singles Chart, but peaked at number four on the German Radio chart.)	— (Note: "Oh Hello" did not enter the Ö3 Austria Top 40, but peaked at number 10 on the Austrian Radio chart.)	—	—	—	—	—	—	—	—	IFPI SWI: Gold	Streets of Gold
"Unforgettable"	2019	66	65	—	7	—	—	—	—	—	—	BVMI: Gold; IFPI SWI: Gold	Streets of Gold
"Better" (with Lena)	2019	15	17	—	19	—	—	—	53	89	—	BVMI: Platinum; IFPI AUT: Gold	Nico Santos
"Play with Fire"	2019	54	59	—	11	—	—	—	—	66	—	BVMI: Gold; IFPI SWI: Gold	Nico Santos
"Like I Love You" (with Topic)	2020	24	32	—	68	—	—	—	41	54	—	BVMI: Gold; IFPI AUT: Platinum	Nico Santos
"Running Back to You" (with Martin Jensen and Alle Farben)	2020	80	— (Note: "Running Back to You" did not enter the Ö3 Austria Top 40, but peaked at number 29 on the Austrian Radio chart.)	—	—	—	—	—	—	—	—		Non-album single
"Leere Hände" (as Santos featuring Sido and Samra)	2021	2	5	—	—	—	—	—	—	5	—		Santos
"End of Summer"	2021	— (Note: "End of Summer" did not enter the Official German Singles Chart, but peaked at number 65 on the German Radio chart.)	—	—	—	—	—	—	—	—	—		Non-album single
"Would I Lie to You"	2021	31	— (Note: "Would I Lie to You" did not enter the Ö3 Austria Top 40, but peaked at number 35 on the Austrian Radio chart.)	—	10	—	—	—	16	—	—		Ride
"In Your Arms (For an Angel)" (with Topic, Robin Schulz and Paul Van Dyk)	2022	36	— (Note: "In Your Arms (For an Angel)" did not enter the Ö3 Austria Top 40, but peaked at number 14 on the Austrian Radio chart.)	10	—	12	—	9	9	61	31	IFPI AUT: Gold	Ride
"Candela" (with Álvaro Soler)	2022	― (Note: "Candela" did not enter the Official German Singles Chart, but peaked at number 82 on the German Radio chart.)	—	—	—	—	—	—	—	—	—		The Best of 2015–2022
"Weekend Lover"	2022	— (Note: "Weekend Lover" did not enter the Official German Singles Chart, but peaked at number one on the German Radio chart.)	— (Note: "Weekend Lover" did not enter the Ö3 Austria Top 40, but peaked at number 21 on the Austrian Radio chart.)	30	4	—	—	—	16	— (Note: "Weekend Lover" did not enter the Schweizer Hitparade, but peaked at number 23 on the Swiss Radio chart.)	—		Ride
"All You Need Is Love" (with Nicky Romero and Jonas Blue)	2023	—	—	—	—	—	—	—	—	—	—		Non-album single
"Number 1"	2023	—	—	—	2	—	—	—	1	—	—		Ride
"Where You Are" (with Fast Boy)	2023	—	—	—	—	—	—	—	74	—	—		Non-album single
"Himmel leer" (as Santos featuring Jazeek)	2024	26	—	—	—	—	—	—	—	81	—		Santos
"Human Being"	2024	—	—	—	5	—	—	—	65	—	—		POV
"Geschlossene Augen" (as Santos featuring Sido)	2024	4	10	—	—	—	—	—	—	12	—		Santos
"Ray of Light"	2024	—	—	—	86	—	—	—	23	—	—		POV
"Das Leben ruft" (as Santos featuring Montez)	2025	24	—	—	—	—	—	—	—	—	—		Non-album singles
"Party Girls Don't Cry" (as Santos featuring Yakary)	2025	68	—	—	—	—	—	—	—	—	—		Non-album singles
"Body" (with Topic and Fireboy DML)	2025	—	—	—	32	—	—	—	1	—	—		POV
"Why Don't You Stay"	2026	—	—	—	41	—	—	—	21	—	—		POV
"—" denotes a recording that did not chart or was not released.

==== As featured artist ====
Title	Year	Peak chart positions					Certifications	Album
Title	Year	GER	AUS	AUT	SWE Heat.	SWI	Certifications	Album
"Won't Let You Fall" (Gigo'n'Migo and Lifters featuring Nico Santos)	2014	—	—	—	—	—		Non-album singles
"Holding On" (Mr. Da-Nos featuring Nico Santos)	2015	—	—	—	—	42		Non-album singles
"Home" (Topic featuring Nico Santos)	2015	12	11	10	2	—	BVMI: Platinum	Non-album singles
"Fastlane" (Jamule featuring Nico Santos)	2020	9	—	17	—	29		Non-album singles
"This City" (Remix) (Sam Fischer featuring Nico Santos)	2020	—	—	—	—	—		Non-album singles
"Die Sonne" (Kontra K featuring Nico Santos)	2023	1	—	—	—	—		Die Hoffnung klaut mir niemand
"—" denotes a recording that did not chart or was not released.

=== Other charted songs ===
Title	Year	Peak chart positions	Album
Title	Year	GER	Album
"Purple Rain" (with Capital Bra and Samra)	2019	50	Berlin lebt 2

=== Songwriting and production credits ===
Title	Year	Artist
"Wir sind groß"	2016	Mark Forster
"Roli"	2016	Shindy
"Achterbahn"	2017	Helene Fischer
"Papa"	2017	Bushido
"So schön kaputt"	2017	SDP
"Lost In You"	2017	Lena
"If I Wasn't Your Daughter"	2017	Lena
"Hellrot"	2017	Prinz Pi, Bosse
"Tausend Tattoos"	2018	Sido
"Mañana"	2021	Álvaro Soler, Cali y El Dandee
"Vamos a Marte"	2021	Helene Fischer, Luis Fonsi

== Awards and nominations ==
Year	Award	Nomination	Work	Result	Ref.
2018	Radio Galaxy Awards	Best Newcomer	Himself	Won	
2018	Audi Generation Awards	Music	Himself	Won	
2018	1LIVE Krone Awards	Best Newcomer	Himself	Nominated	
2018	1LIVE Krone Awards	Best Single	"Safe"	Nominated	
2019	1LIVE Krone Awards	Best Single	"Better"	Nominated	
2019	1LIVE Krone Awards	Best Male Artist	Himself	Nominated	
2019	Bravo Otto Awards	Musician National	Himself	Nominated	
2020	Bravo Otto Awards	Musician National	Himself	Bronze	
2020	Nickelodeon Kids' Choice Awards	Favourite Singer (for DACH)	Himself	Nominated	
2020	Nickelodeon Kids' Choice Awards	Favourite Song (for DACH)	"Better"	Won	
2020	1LIVE Krone Awards	Best Male Artist	Himself	Nominated	
2020	MTV Europe Music Awards	Best German Act	Himself	Nominated	
2021	Nickelodeon Kids' Choice Awards	Favourite Singer (for DACH)	Himself	Nominated	
2021	Nickelodeon Kids' Choice Awards	Favourite Team (for DACH)	The Voice of Germany	Won	
2021	Bravo Otto Awards	Musician National	Himself	Pending	
2021	1LIVE Krone Awards	Best Single	"Would I Lie to You"	Won	
