= Breaking Me =

2019 single by Topic and A7S

Single by Topic and A7S
- Released: 19 December 2019
- Length: 2:46
- Label: Virgin; Universal
- Songwriters: Alexander Tidebrink; Molly Irvine; René Miller; Tobias Topic
- Producer: Tobias Topic

Topic singles chronology
"Sólo Contigo" (2018)	"Breaking Me" (2019)	"Like I Love You" (2020)

A7S singles chronology
"Hey Baby" (2019)	"Breaking Me" (2019)	"Why Do You Lie to Me" (2020)

Lyric video
- "Breaking Me" on YouTube

"Breaking Me" is a song by German DJ Topic and Swedish singer A7S. It was released on 19 December 2019 through Virgin and Universal. Since its release, the song became Topic's signature song and biggest hit single to date, reaching number one in Belgium (Wallonia)'s Ultratop chart, Israel, Portugal, and Romania, as well as the top 10 in many other countries, including Australia, Canada, Germany, Ireland, the Netherlands, New Zealand and the United Kingdom. The video for the song was shot in several locations around Lisbon, Portugal, mainly Cais do Sodré pink street, Santa Justa Lift and LX Factory.

"Breaking Me" was nominated for Top Dance/Electronic Song at the Billboard Music Awards, but lost to "Roses" by Saint Jhn.

== Background ==
In talking about their song, German DJ Topic and Swedish singer A7S revealed that it's the "sweet spot between a heartache and energetic beats". According to Topic, the song "is about a situation in a relationship with a certain dependency, in which one always gives a little more and "breaks" because of that". The song was written during songwriting sessions in Berlin and Miami over the course of two months.

== Critical reception ==
Rachel Kupfer of EDM described the song as "vaguely tropical house" which is made for "both dimly lit dance floors and pop-inspired festival sets". He also noted how much A7S's vocals "match a bouncy bass line and clubby synths". Critics also cited the fact that despite A7S' anonymity, the song all the more benefits from the hook sung by the Swedish artist.

== Charts ==
=== Weekly charts ===
Chart (2020)	Peak position
Australia (ARIA)	4
Austria (Ö3 Austria Top 40)	2
Belgium (Ultratop 50 Flanders)	3
Belgium (Ultratop 50 Wallonia)	1
Bulgaria Airplay (PROPHON)	1
Canada Hot 100 (Billboard)	9
Canada AC (Billboard)	31
Canada CHR/Top 40 (Billboard)	3
Canada Hot AC (Billboard)	25
CIS Airplay (TopHit)	5
Croatia International Airplay (Top lista)	3
Czech Republic Airplay (ČNS IFPI)	1
Czech Republic Singles Digital (ČNS IFPI)	4
Denmark (Tracklisten)	7
Estonia (Eesti Tipp-40)	10
Finland (Suomen virallinen lista)	12
France (SNEP)	14
Germany (GfK)	3
Germany Airplay (BVMI)	1
Global 200 (Billboard)	21
Greece International (IFPI)	5
Hungary (Dance Top 40)	1
Hungary (Rádiós Top 40)	1
Hungary (Single Top 40)	1
Hungary (Stream Top 40)	1
Iceland (Tónlistinn)	6
Ireland (IRMA)	3
Israel International Airplay (Media Forest)	1
Italy (FIMI)	7
Italy Airplay (EarOne)	1
Latvia Streaming (LaIPA)	42
Lebanon (Lebanese Top 20)	2
Lithuania (AGATA)	5
Mexico Airplay (Billboard)	2
Netherlands (Dutch Top 40)	2
Netherlands (Single Top 100)	5
New Zealand (Recorded Music NZ)	7
Norway (VG-lista)	9
Poland Airplay (ZPAV)	2
Portugal (AFP)	1
Romania (Airplay 100)	1
Russia Airplay (TopHit)	3
San Marino Airplay (SMRTV Top 50)	5
Scottish Singles Sales (Official Charts)	3
Slovakia Airplay (ČNS IFPI)	1
Slovakia Singles Digital (ČNS IFPI)	4
Slovenia Airplay (SloTop50)	1
Spain (Promusicae)	36
Sweden (Sverigetopplistan)	11
Switzerland (Schweizer Hitparade)	4
UK Singles (Official Charts)	3
Ukraine Airplay (TopHit)	1
US Billboard Hot 100	53
US Hot Dance/Electronic Songs (Billboard)	3
US Pop Airplay (Billboard)	16
US Rolling Stone Top 100	75

2023–2026 weekly chart performance
Chart (2023–2026)	Peak position
Belarus Airplay (TopHit)	156
Kazakhstan Airplay (TopHit)	69
Lithuania Airplay (TopHit)	62
Moldova Airplay (TopHit)	114
Romania Airplay (TopHit)	61

=== Monthly charts ===
Monthly chart performance
Chart (2026)	Peak position
Kazakhstan Airplay (TopHit)	82

=== Year-end charts ===
Chart (2020)	Position
Australia (ARIA)	16
Austria (Ö3 Austria Top 40)	5
Belgium (Ultratop Flanders)	6
Belgium (Ultratop Wallonia)	8
Bulgaria Airplay (PROPHON)	3
Canada (Canadian Hot 100)	34
Croatia (HRT)	10
Denmark (Tracklisten)	13
France (SNEP)	42
Germany (Official German Charts)	5
Hungary (Dance Top 40)	14
Hungary (Rádiós Top 40)	6
Hungary (Single Top 40)	1
Hungary (Stream Top 40)	3
Iceland (Tónlistinn)	17
Ireland (IRMA)	15
Italy (FIMI)	12
Netherlands (Dutch Top 40)	3
Netherlands (Single Top 100)	9
New Zealand (Recorded Music NZ)	38
Norway (VG-lista)	17
Poland (Polish Airplay Top 100)	6
Portugal (AFP)	15
Romania (Airplay 100)	4
Russia Airplay (Tophit)	17
Sweden (Sverigetopplistan)	21
Switzerland (Schweizer Hitparade)	4
UK Singles (OCC)	15
Ukraine Airplay (Tophit)	15
US Hot Dance/Electronic Songs (Billboard)	8

Chart (2021)	Position
Australia (ARIA)	99
CIS (Tophit)	53
Germany (Official German Charts)	66
Global 200 (Billboard)	129
Hungary (Dance Top 40)	8
Hungary (Rádiós Top 40)	44
Hungary (Stream Top 40)	36
Portugal (AFP)	68
Russia Airplay (Tophit)	103
Switzerland (Schweizer Hitparade)	66
Ukraine Airplay (Tophit)	23
US Hot Dance/Electronic Songs (Billboard)	19

Chart (2024)	Position
Lithuania Airplay (TopHit)	91

Chart (2025)	Position
Lithuania Airplay (TopHit)	157

== Certifications ==
Region	Certification	Certified units/sales
Australia (ARIA)	4× Platinum	280,000^{‡}
Austria (IFPI Austria)	3× Platinum	90,000^{‡}
Belgium (BRMA)	2× Platinum	80,000^{‡}
Brazil (Pro-Música Brasil)	2× Diamond	320,000^{‡}
Canada (Music Canada)	7× Platinum	560,000^{‡}
Denmark (IFPI Danmark)	2× Platinum	180,000^{‡}
France (SNEP)	Diamond	333,333^{‡}
Germany (BVMI)	2× Platinum	800,000^{‡}
Italy (FIMI)	3× Platinum	210,000^{‡}
New Zealand (RMNZ)	3× Platinum	90,000^{‡}
Poland (ZPAV)	3× Platinum	60,000^{‡}
Portugal (AFP)	4× Platinum	40,000^{‡}
Spain (Promusicae)	2× Platinum	120,000^{‡}
United Kingdom (BPI)	2× Platinum	1,200,000^{‡}
United States (RIAA)	2× Platinum	2,000,000^{‡}
Streaming
Greece (IFPI Greece)	Platinum	2,000,000^{†}
^{‡} Sales+streaming figures based on certification alone.^{†} Streaming-only figures based on certification alone.

== Release history ==
Region	Date	Format	Label	Ref.
United States	7 July 2020	Contemporary hit radio	Astralwerks; Capitol	

== See also ==
- List of Airplay 100 number ones of the 2020s
- List of German airplay number-one songs of 2020
- List of number-one singles of 2020 (Portugal)
