= Topic (DJ) =

German DJ and producer (born 1992)

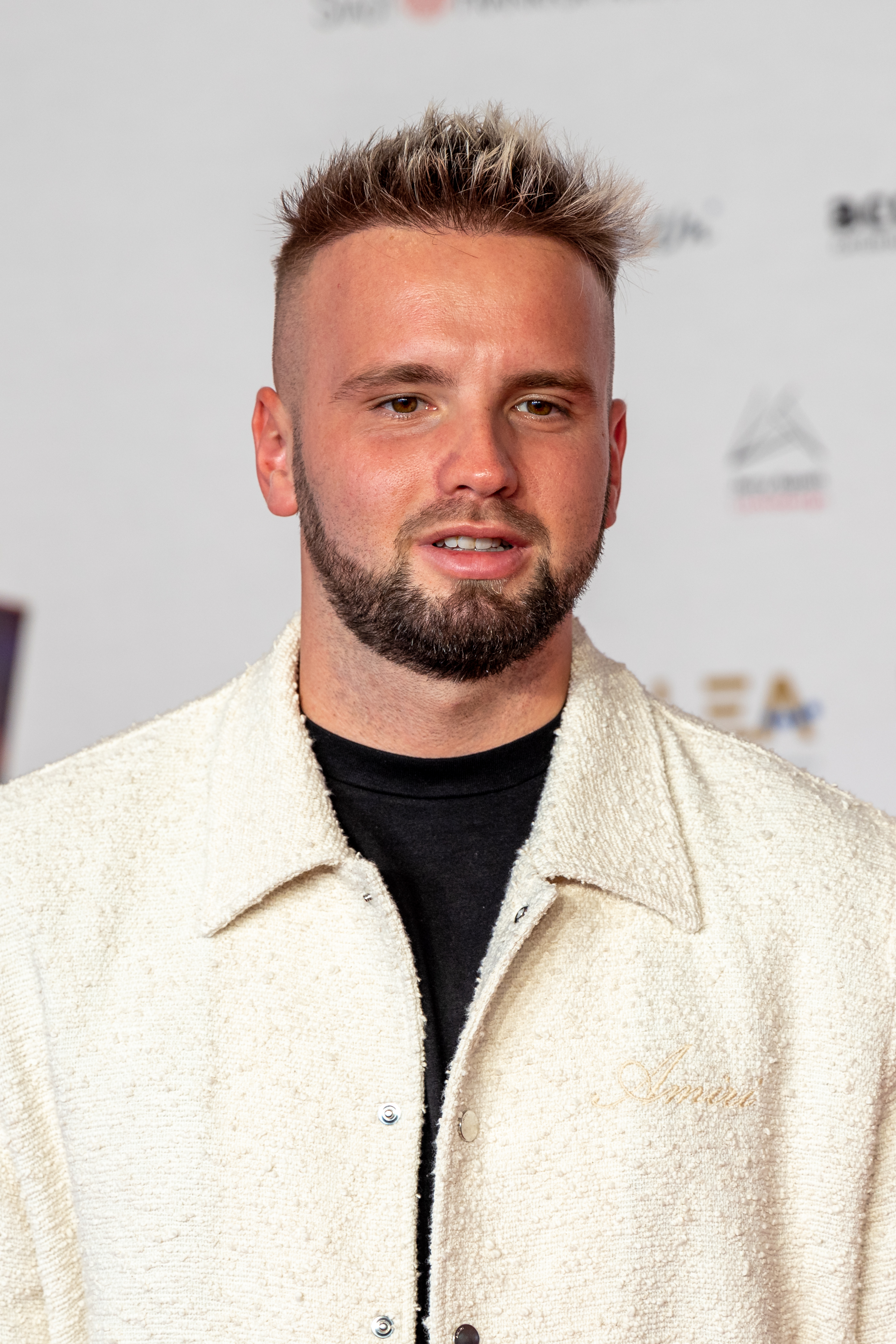
- Topic in 2022

Background information
- Also known as: Topic42
- Born: Tobias Topic; 23 March 1992 (age 34); Solingen, North Rhine-Westphalia, Germany
- Genre: EDM
- Occupations: DJ; record producer
- Labels: Recordjet; Universal

Tobias Topic (German: [toˈbiːas ˈtoːpɪtʃ]; born 23 March 1992), also known mononymously as Topic (/ˈtɒpɪk/) or Topic42, is a German DJ and music producer of Croatian origin. After gaining success with his song "Home", which was certified platinum in Australia and Germany, he made his international breakthrough in 2020 with "Breaking Me".

== Career ==
=== Early career and commercial breakthrough ===
Born in Solingen, Topic is of paternal Croatian descent. He went to a high school in Hessen. At the age of 16, he started using Logic Studio, a digital audio workstation, to produce music with the guidance of a teacher. He started his musical career on social media with the assistance of YouTube musicians who contacted him. Topic's first release, a house song called "Light It Up", was released at the end of 2014 and reached more than one million views on his YouTube channel. In summer 2015, he released his debut album "Miles", which charted both German and Austrian charts.

Topic made the singles charts in both countries in January 2016 with the song "Home" featuring Nico Santos on vocals. In April 2016, the track was released in Australia and reached the 11th place in its charts and went double platinum. He has cited the internet as a source of his success, stating "The Internet has actually brought the world closer together."

In July 2016, the single "Find You" followed, sung by Dutch singer Jake Reese, who has become famous by the Dutch edition of X-Factor and a collaboration with Hardwell on his songs Mad World and Run Wild. Already after one week, the song achieved a ranking in the single charts, but couldn't follow the success of his previous single.

In September 2016, he signed a record deal with Sony Music/ATV. In the same year, Topic received a nomination for the MTV Europe Music Awards in Best German Act.

=== 2017–2018: "Perfect" ===
He made the official single charts of Germany and Austria again in 2017 with the track Break My Habits with the vocals of Swedish singer-songwriter Patrik Jean.

On 26 January 2018, Topic collaborated with American Fifth Harmony member and singer Ally Brooke for the single "Perfect". The success of airplay also received attention in the United States, in particular through Brooke's appearance on the TV show Wild 'n Out. For the song, they were nominated for the Teen Choice Award 2018 in the "Electronic / Dance Song" category.

With the track "Sólo Contigo", which was created in collaboration with Juan Magán and German singer Lena Meyer-Landrut, he released a Spanish-language single for the first time in spring 2018. The song "The Less I Know" followed together with Alexander Tidebrink.

=== 2019: International breakthrough with "Breaking Me" ===
On 19 December 2019, "Breaking Me" was released as the sixth single. It is a collaboration with the Swedish singer A7S and the first international chart success for Topic after almost two years. The single reached the Top 10 positions in Germany, the Netherlands, Austria, Switzerland, Canada, Italy, Australia, New Zealand, Denmark and Ireland.

With "Breaking Me", Topic also reached the Top 10 of the British single charts for the first time and achieved his first number one on the Portuguese singles chart. In the US, he dominated the Dance chart for three weeks and ranked #53 on the Billboard Hot 100. The single reached nearly a billion streams on Spotify today and more than five billion streams overall.

=== 2020: "Like I Love You" and "Why Do You Lie to Me" ===
On 13 March 2020, the second single collaboration with Nico Santos, "Like I Love You" was released. The song was also promoted with a joint live appearance on the famous German TV show Luke! Die Schule und ich at prime time. The single reached #24 in the German single charts as well as #2 in the airplay charts.

On 28 August 2020, the single "Why Do You Lie to Me" was released. This was the second collaboration of Topic and A7S features American rapper Lil Baby.

=== 2021: "Your Love (9PM)" and "My Heart Goes (La Di Da)" ===
In January 2021, Topic remade German producer ATB's number-one hit "9 PM (Till I Come)", collaborating with ATB. Retitled "Your Love (9PM)", the record also features A7S' vocals, making it their third collaboration, and was released on Positiva Records. The record charted in a number of markets including the Top 10 in Germany, Austria, Switzerland and the UK. It is Topic's second most successful track to this date and amassed more than 500 million streams on Spotify alone. “Your Love (9PM)” was nominated in the category “International Song of the Year” at the BRIT Awards 2022.

In June 2021, the single Chain My Heart followed together with American popstar and singer Bebe Rexha, making it to #16 on the US Dance charts. On 30 July 2021, the song Drive was released in a collaboration with British electropop band Clean Bandit and British singer Wes Nelson. The song reached rank 17 in the British single charts. Four weeks later, the next composition appeared with British singer Becky Hill. "My Heart Goes (La Di Da)" was released on 24 August 2021 and reached #11 on the UK charts.

=== 2022: "Kernkraft 400 (A Better Day)" and further achievements ===
On 28 January 2022, Topic released the single In Your Arms (For An Angeŕl) together with Robin Schulz, Nico Santos and Paul van Dyk. This is a new edition of van Dyk's For an Angel from 1994. In collaboration with German Popstar Alvaro Soler, the second Spanish-language single Solo Para Ti was released on 22 April 2022.

The track "Kernkraft 400 (A Better Day)" was released on 17 June 2022, featuring singer and producer A7S, and is built on a sample of Zombie Nation's "Kernkraft 400" (1999). On 2 September 2022, Topic and Swedish singer John Martin released the single "Follow Me." It was Topic's first club track and his first release on the label Tomorrowland Music, which had previously worked with artists including Martin Garrix and Felix Jaehn.

Topic was also part of the “Top 100 DJs 2022” from DJ Mag. After an impressive festival season, two diamond certifications in 28 countries and two awards in 2020 and 2021, he was able to secure rank 69.

Topic was part of the documentary We Are Tomorrow from Tomorrowland, that was published on YouTube on 20 September 2022. The four protagonists Topic, Gaggan Anand, Kelly De Clercq and Vicky Tah were filmed and interviewed on their road to Tomorrowland. In the documentary, Topic's live performance and career are displayed and he talks about his idea of a new edition of the hit "Breaking Me" with the new title "Saving Me", as the soundtrack of the documentary with American singer-songwriter Sasha Alex Sloan.

== Discography ==
=== Albums ===
List of studio albums, with selected chart positions and certifications
Title	Album details	Peak chart positions	
Title	Album details	GER	AUT
Miles	Released: 31 July 2015; Label: Takeover Music; Formats: CD, digital download	67	70

=== Singles ===
Title	Year	Peak chart positions										Certifications	Album
Title	Year	GER	AUS	AUT	CAN	IRE	NLD	SWI	UK	US Dance/ Elec.	WW	Certifications	Album
"Light It Up" (with Jona Selle)	2014	—	—	—	—	—	—	—	—	—	—		Miles
"Real Stars" (with Marco Minella)	2015	—	—	—	—	—	—	—	—	—	—		Miles
"Miles" (with Krism)	2015	—	—	—	—	—	—	—	—	—	—		Miles
"Home" (featuring Nico Santos)	2015	12	11	10	—	—	—	—	—	—	—	BVMI: Platinum; ARIA: Platinum	Miles
"Fly Away" (with Lili Pistorius)	2015	—	—	—	—	—	—	—	—	—	—		Miles
"Find You" (with Jake Reese)	2016	57	—	63	—	—	—	—	—	—	—		Non-album singles
"Break My Habits"	2017	58	—	73	—	—	—	—	—	—	—		Non-album singles
"Perfect" (with Ally Brooke)	2018	98	—	73	—	—	—	—	—	38	—		Non-album singles
"Sólo Contigo" (with Juan Magán and Lena)	2018	—	—	—	—	—	—	—	—	—	—		Non-album singles
"Breaking Me" (with A7S)	2019	3	4	2	9	3	2	4	3	3	21	BVMI: 2× Platinum; ARIA: 4× Platinum; BPI: Platinum; IFPI AUT: 3× Platinum; MC: 4× Platinum; RIAA: Platinum	Non-album singles
"Like I Love You" (with Nico Santos)	2020	24	—	32	—	—	—	54	—	—	—	BVMI: Gold; IFPI AUT: Platinum	Nico Santos
"Why Do You Lie to Me" (with A7S featuring Lil Baby)	2020	98	94	—	—	—	—	86	—	17	—		Non-album singles
"Lost" (with Samra)	2020	3	—	7	—	—	—	8	—	—	—	BVMI: Gold	Non-album singles
"Your Love (9PM)" (with ATB and A7S)	2021	6	18	8	77	8	12	6	8	9	37	BVMI: 3× Gold; ARIA: Platinum; BPI: Platinum; MC: Gold	Non-album singles
"Chain My Heart" (with Bebe Rexha)	2021	100	—	—	—	—	—	—	—	16	—		Non-album singles
"Drive" (with Clean Bandit featuring Wes Nelson)	2021	—	—	—	—	30	—	—	17	25	—	BPI: Platinum	Non-album singles
"My Heart Goes (La Di Da)" (with Becky Hill)	2021	87	100	—	—	6	—	—	11	23	—	ARIA: 2× Platinum; BPI: Platinum	Only Honest on the Weekend
"Ich bin weg (Boro Boro)" (with Samra featuring Arash)	2021	9	—	16	—	—	—	12	—	—	—		Non-album singles
"In Your Arms (For an Angel)" (with Robin Schulz, Nico Santos and Paul Van Dyk)	2022	36	—	—	—	—	—	61	—	33	—	IFPI AUT: Gold	Non-album singles
"Solo Para Ti" (with Alvaro Soler)	2022	57	—	65	—	—	77	52	—	—	—		Non-album singles
"Kernkraft 400 (A Better Day)" (with A7S)	2022	26	—	34	—	—	29	100	—	—	—	IFPI AUT: Gold	Non-album singles
"All or Nothing" (with Hrvy)	2022	—	—	—	—	—	—	—	—	—	—		Non-album singles
"Forget You" (with Fast Boy)	2023	73	—	—	—	—	—	—	—	—	—		Non-album singles
"Lucid Dream"	2023	—	—	—	—	—	—	—	—	—	—		Non-album singles
"One by One" (with Robin Schulz featuring Oaks)	2024	—	—	—	—	—	—	—	—	—	—		Non-album singles
"Peakin'"	2024	—	—	—	—	—	—	—	—	—	—		Non-album singles
"I Adore You" (with Hugel and Arash featuring J Balvin and Ellie Goulding)	2024	8	—	10	—	—	16	2	69	8	148	ARIA: Platinum; BPI: Gold; BVMI: Platinum; IFPI AUT: Platinum; IFPI SWI: Platinum; MC: 2× Platinum	Non-album singles
"Control of Me" (featuring Daecolm)	2025	—	—	—	—	—	—	—	—	—	—		Non-album singles
"Body" (with Fireboy DML and Nico Santos)	2025	—	—	—	—	—	—	—	—	—	—		Non-album singles
"Bad Boy"	2025	—	—	—	—	—	—	—	—	—	—		Non-album singles
"Missing Me" (with A7S and Shimza)	2026	—	—	—	—	—	—	—	—	—	—		Non-album singles
"Sorry Papi" (with Becky G)	2026	—	—	—	—	—	95	—	—	—	—		Non-album singles
"Right Here, Right Now" (rework)	2026	—	—	—	—	—	—	—	—	—	—		Non-album singles
"Tik Tak" (with Sarra)	2026	—	—	—	—	—	—	—	—	—	—		Non-album singles
"Aha" (with Daryll Ferreier)	2026	—	—	—	—	—	—	—	—	—	—		Non-album singles
"Lucky Ones" (with Carteblanche)	2026	—	—	—	—	—	—	—	—	—	—		Non-album singles
"Follow You DOwn"	2026	—	—	—	—	—	—	—	—	—	—		Non-album singles
"In My Aura"	2026	—	—	—	—	—	—	—	—	—	—		Non-album singles
"—" denotes a recording that did not chart or was not released.

=== Remixes ===
- 2020: Surf Mesa featuring Emilee – "ILY (I Love You Baby)" (Topic Remix)
- 2020: Masn and B-Case - "Psycho!" (Topic Remix)
- 2020: Becky Hill and Sigala - "Heaven on My Mind" (Topic Remix)
- 2020: Dennis Lloyd - "Alien" (Topic Remix)
- 2020: Clean Bandit, Mabel, and 24kGoldn - "Tick Tock" (Topic Remix)
- 2021: Moby featuring Gregory Porter and Amythyst Kiah - "Natural Blues" (Topic Remix)
- 2021: Regard, Troye Sivan and Tate McRae - "You" (Topic Remix)
- 2021: Clean Bandit and Topic featuring Wes Nelson - "Drive" (Topic VIP Remix)
- 2022: Lewis Thompson and David Guetta - "Take Me Back" (Topic Remix)
- 2022: Kamrad, Topic and Max Bering - "I Believe" (Topic Remix)
- 2023: Loreen – "Tattoo" (Topic Remix)

== Awards and nominations ==
Year	Organization	Award	Work	Result	Ref.
2016	MTV Europe Music Awards	Best German Act	Himself	Nominated	
2016	1 Live Krone	Best Single	Home (with Nico Santos)	Nominated	
2018	Teen Choice Awards	Choice Electronic/Dance Song	Perfect (with Ally Brooke)	Nominated	
2020	LOS40 Music Awards	Best Dance Act	Himself	Won	
2020	1 Live Krone	Best Single	Breaking Me (with A7S)	Nominated	
2020	1 Live Krone	Best Dance Act	Himself	Nominated	
2021	Audi Generation Award	Music	Himself	Won	
2022	BRIT Awards	Best International Song	Your Love (9PM) (mit ATB & A7S)	Nominated	
