= A7S =

Swedish musician (born 1994)

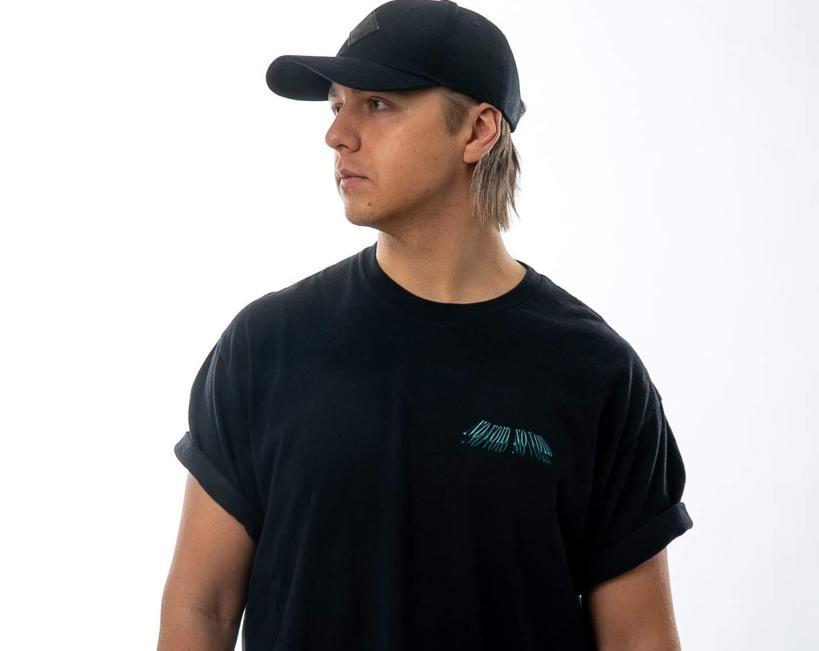
- A7S in 2020

Background information
- Born: Alexander Michael Tidebrink Stomberg; 3 May 1994 (age 32); Ulricehamn, Sweden
- Occupations: Singer; disc jockey; producer; songwriter

Alexander Michael Tidebrink Stomberg (born 3 May 1994), known professionally as A7S, is a Swedish singer, disc jockey, producer and songwriter. His collaboration "Breaking Me" with German artist Topic was released on 19 December 2019. It reached top 10 positions in 24 countries including the United Kingdom, Germany, the Netherlands, Austria, Switzerland, Canada, Australia and Ireland. With "Breaking Me", A7S also reached the British single charts for the first time and garnered his first number-one in the Portuguese charts. It also received a nomination for Top Dance/Electronic Song at the 2021 Billboard Music Awards.

Tidebrink has worked with artists such as Lil Baby, David Guetta, Wizkid, Clean Bandit, Bebe Rexha, J Balvin, Ellie Goulding, Hugel (DJ), Nicky Romero, Hardwell, Smith & Thell, Becky G and Vigiland.

His song "Breaking Me" peaked as #6 in the world on Spotify's global chart in 2020 and his song Your Love (9PM) was the 6th most played song on radio in the world in 2021.

A7S co-wrote the song "Only Thing We Know" by Alle Farben, which was certified gold in Germany and Austria."Only Thing We Know" also went #1 on the German airplay charts which was the second number one on German airplay for Tidebrink. He also wrote and is featured artist on the track "Be Your Friend" by Vigiland which peaked at number 7 on the Swedish chart and was the fourth most streamed track in Sweden in 2018.

His first 2020 single "Why Do You Lie to Me", together with Topic, features American rapper Lil Baby, and was released on 28 August 2020.

In 2021, A7S teamed up again with Topic, this time alongside German producer ATB, on the single "Your Love (9PM)", a reinterpretation of ATB's 1998 hit "9 PM (Till I Come)". The song achieved widespread commercial success across Europe and internationally. It peaked at number eight on the UK Singles Chart and reached the top 10 in several European countries, including Germany and Ireland. The track also entered the top ten on the US Billboard Dance/Electronic Songs chart. In 2022, the single was nominated for International Song of the Year at the Brit Awards 2022.

== "Collaboration on I Adore You" ==
In 2024, Tidebrink co-wrote and co-produced the single "I Adore You" by Hugel, Topic and Arash, featuring British vocalist Daecolm. The song was released on 19 July 2024 through Universal Music Group.

The single achieved significant international commercial success. It reached number one on several national airplay charts, including Romania, Moldova and the CIS region, and topped multiple European dance radio charts. In Germany, the track peaked at number 8 on the Official German Singles Chart and reached number one on the German Dance Chart.

"I Adore You" also charted in the Netherlands (Dutch Top 40 and Single Top 100), Belgium (Ultratop), Switzerland, Austria and the United Kingdom. In the United States, the track reached the top 10 of the Billboard Dance/Electronic Songs chart.

== Discography ==
=== Singles ===
==== As lead artist ====
List of singles as lead artist, with selected chart positions and certifications, showing year released and album name
Single	Year	Peak chart positions										Certifications	Album
Single	Year	SWE	AUS	AUT	CAN	GER	IRE	NLD	SWI	UK	US Dance/ Elec.	Certifications	Album
"Addicted" (with Vigiland)	2015	51	—	—	—	—	—	—	—	—	—	GLF: 2× Platinum	Non-album singles
"Be Your Friend" (with Vigiland & Ted Nights)	2018	6	—	—	—	—	—	—	—	—	—	GLF: 5× Platinum	Non-album singles
"Nice to Meet You" (with Vigiland)	2018	43	—	—	—	—	—	—	—	—	—	GLF: Platinum	Non-album singles
"We're the Same" (with Vigiland)	2019	15	—	—	—	—	—	—	—	—	—	GLF: 2× Platinum	Non-album singles
"Breaking Me" (with Topic)	2019	11	4	2	9	3	3	2	4	3	3	ARIA: Gold; BPI: 2× Platinum; BVMI: 2× Platinum; IFPI AUT: 3× Platinum; MC: 4× Platinum; RIAA: Gold	Non-album singles
"Why Do You Lie to Me" (with Topic featuring Lil Baby)	2020	—	94	—	—	98	—	—	86	—	—		Non-album singles
"Your Love (9PM)" (with Topic and ATB)	2021	64	18	8	77	6	8	7	6	8	10	ARIA: Platinum; BPI: Platinum; BVMI: 3× Gold	Non-album singles
"Nirvana"	2021	—	—	—	—	—	—	—	—	—	—		Non-album singles
"On and On" (with S1mba)	2022	—	—	—	—	—	—	—	—	—	—		Non-album singles
"Kernkraft 400 (A Better Day)" (with Topic)	2022	—	—	34	—	26	—	29	100	—	—	IFPI AUT: Gold	Non-album singles
"Jumpstart"	2022	—	—	—	—	—	—	—	—	—	—		Non-album singles
"Dumb"	2023	—	—	—	—	—	—	—	—	—	—		Non-album singles
"Lost in the Music"	2024	—	—	—	—	—	—	—	—	—	—		Non-album singles
"Monster" (with Alok)	2024	—	—	—	—	—	—	—	—	—	—		Non-album singles
"Out My Head" (with Topic)	2024	—	—	—	—	—	—	—	—	—	—		Non-album singles
"Eyes On Me"	2024	—	—	—	—	—	—	—	—	—	—		Non-album singles
"Lighter" (with David Guetta and WizKid)	2025	—	—	—	—	—	—	—	—	—	—		Non-album singles
"Dreaming" (vs Header)	2025	—	—	—	—	—	—	—	—	—	—		Non-album singles
"Missing Me" (with Topic & Shimza)	2026	—	—	—	—	—	—	—	—	—	—		Non-album singles
"Fire" (with Loreen)	2026	—	—	—	—	—	—	—	—	—	—		Non-album singles
"—" denotes a recording that did not chart or was not released.

==== As featured artist ====
List of singles as featured artist, with selected chart positions, showing year released and album name
Single	Year	Peak chart positions				Album
Single	Year	SMR	SVK	UK	US Dance/ Elec.	Album
"Everything but You" (Clean Bandit featuring A7S)	2022	38	53	55	20	TBA
"Location" (Cheat Codes featuring A7S)	2023	—	—	—	—	TBA
"—" denotes a recording that did not chart, was not eligible to chart, or was not released in that territory.

== Songwriting discography ==
Artist	Single	Year	Peak positions				Certifications
Artist	Single	Year	AUT	DEN	GER	SWI	Certifications
Christopher	"Bad"	2018	—	10	—	—	IFPI DEN: Platinum
Alle Farben	"Only Thing We Know" (with Kelvin Jones and Younotus)	2018	24	—	20	41	BVMI: Gold; IFPI AUT: Gold
Hugel (DJ) Topic (DJ) Arash (singer) Daecolm	"I adore you"	2024					

== Awards and nominations ==
Year	Award	Category	Nominee(s)	Result	Ref.
2018	P3 Guld	Song of the year	As a Writer and Artist "Vigiland ft. Alexander Tidebrink - Be your friend"	Nominated	
2018	1Live Krone	Song of the year	As a Writer "Alle farben - Only thing we know"	Nominated	
2020	Denniz Pop Awards	Rookie songwriter/producer	Alexander Tidebrink/A7S	Nominated	
2020	1Live Krone	Song of the Year	A7S "Breaking Me"	Nominated	
2021	2021 Billboard Music Awards	Song of the year	A7S "Breaking Me"	Nominated	
2021	1Live krone Awards	Best single	A7S "Your Love (9PM)"	Nominated	
2021	Brit Awards	International Song Of The Year	A7S "Your love(9pm)"	Nominated	
2021	Musikförläggarnas pris	International Success Of The Year	A7S/Alexander Tidebrink	Nominated	
2022	1Live krone Awards	Best dance single	A7S "Kernkraft 400 (A Better Day)"	Nominated	
