= Mike Oldfield singles discography =

- Singles: 52
- Music videos: 38
- Promotional singles: 33

This is the singles discography of English musician Mike Oldfield.

== Singles ==
Title	Vocals	Year	Peak chart positions										Album
Title	Vocals	Year	UK	AUS	AUT	DEN	GER	IRE	NL	SPA	SWI	US	Album
"Mike Oldfield's Single" (Note: Note that US version is a very different edit. The UK version was featured on the 2009 reissue of Tubular Bells.) ("Tubular Bells")		1974	31	12	—	—	—	—	—	—	—	7	Tubular Bells
"Froggy Went a-Courting" (Note: "Froggy Went A-Courting" was only released as a single in the Netherlands.)		1974	—	—	—	—	—	—	—	—	—	—	Non-album singles
"Don Alfonso"	David Bedford	1975	—	—	—	—	—	—	—	—	—	—	Non-album singles
"In Dulci Jubilo" / "On Horseback"	Mike Oldfield on "On Horseback"	1975	4	—	—	—	—	7	2	—	—	—	Non-album single (Note: Whilst "In Dulci Jubilo" was released as a non-album single, "On Horseback" had featured as the final section of the side two of Ommadawn.)
"Theme from Ommadawn" (Note: "Theme from Ommadawn" was only released as a single in the US, Canada and France.)		1976	—	—	—	—	—	—	—	—	—	—	Ommadawn
"Portsmouth"		1976	3	23	—	—	—	19	—	—	—	—	Non-album singles
"William Tell Overture"		1977	51	—	—	—	—	—	—	—	—	—	Non-album singles
"Cuckoo Song" (Note: Credited to Mike Oldfield with Les Penning.)		1977	53	—	—	—	—	—	—	—	—	—	Non-album singles
"Guilty"		1979	22	—	—	—	—	—	—	—	—	—	Non-album singles
"Guilty" (live) (Note: The live version of "Guilty" was only released as single in Germany, Portugal and the Netherlands.)		1979	—	—	—	—	—	—	—	—	—	—	Exposed
"Blue Peter"		1979	19	—	—	—	—	—	—	—	—	—	Non-album single
"North Star/Platinum Finale" (Note: "North Star/Platinum Finale" was only released as a single in Spain.)		1980	—	—	—	—	—	—	—	—	—	—	Platinum
"Arrival"		1980	—	—	13	12 (Note: Charted in 1983)	—	—	—	—	—	—	QE2
"Sheba" / "Wonderful Land"		1980	—	— 40	—	—	—	—	—	—	—	—	QE2
"Five Miles Out"	Mike Oldfield and Maggie Reilly	1982	43	61	—	—	42	—	—	4	—	—	Five Miles Out
"Family Man"	Maggie Reilly	1982	45	—	—	7	—	—	—	3	—	—	Five Miles Out
"Mistake" (Note: Credited to the Mike Oldfield Group.)	Maggie Reilly	1982	—	—	—	10	56	—	—	—	—	—	Non-album single (Note: "Mistake" was released as a non-album single in the UK/Europe, but was included on the North American release of Crises.)
"Moonlight Shadow"	Maggie Reilly	1983	4	6	1	1	2	1	1	1	1	—	Crises
"Shadow on the Wall"	Roger Chapman	1983	95	—	1	9	3	22	9	10	4	—	Crises
"Crime of Passion"	Barry Palmer	1984	61	—	—	1	17	22	—	—	17	—	Non-album single
"To France"	Maggie Reilly	1984	48	97	9	1	6	—	4	3	7	—	Discovery
"Tricks of the Light"	Maggie Reilly and Barry Palmer	1984	91	—	—	—	46	—	—	—	—	—	Discovery
"Étude"		1984	111	—	—	—	—	—	—	—	—	—	The Killing Fields
"Pictures in the Dark"	Anita Hegerland, Barry Palmer and Aled Jones	1985	50	—	3	8	4	—	—	—	5	—	Non-album singles
"Shine"	Jon Anderson	1986	100	—	—	11	31	—	—	—	—	—	Non-album singles
"In High Places"	Jon Anderson	1987	161	—	—	—	—	—	—	—	—	—	Non-album single (Note: "In High Places" was originally released in 1983 on Crises, but was released as a single in 1987 to promote Richard Branson's launch of the then-largest ever hot air balloon.)
"Islands"	Bonnie Tyler	1987	100	—	—	—	41	—	—	22	22	—	Islands
"The Time Has Come"	Anita Hegerland	1987	190	—	—	—	—	—	—	—	—	—	Islands
"Magic Touch" (Note: "Magic Touch" was not released as a single in the UK, but was released in the majority of other territories.)	Max Bacon	1987	—	—	—	—	—	—	—	—	—	—	Islands
"Flying Start"	Kevin Ayers	1988	132	—	—	—	—	—	—	—	—	—	Islands
"Earth Moving"	Nikki Bentley	1989	93	—	—	—	—	—	—	—	—	—	Earth Moving
"Innocent"	Anita Hegerland	1989	—	—	—	—	8	—	45	—	—	—	Earth Moving
"(One Glance Is) Holy" (Note: "(One Glance Is) Holy" was only released as a single in Germany.)	Adrian Belew	1989	—	—	—	—	—	—	—	—	—	—	Earth Moving
"Étude" (reissue) (Note: "Étude" was reissued in 1990 after being used in an advert for Nurofen.)		1990	—	—	—	—	—	—	—	—	—	—	Non-album single
"Heaven's Open"		1991	—	—	—	—	—	—	—	—	—	—	Heaven's Open
"Gimme Back"		1991	—	—	—	—	—	—	—	—	—	—	Heaven's Open
"Sentinel"		1992	10	—	—	—	—	14	—	—	—	—	Tubular Bells II
"Tattoo"		1992	33	—	—	—	—	—	—	—	—	—	Tubular Bells II
"The Bell"	Vivian Stanshall (UK) (Note: Many different mixes exist and on the UK charting version Stanshall features as the Master of Ceremonies.)	1993	50	—	—	13	—	—	—	—	—	—	Tubular Bells II
"Moonlight Shadow" (reissue)	Maggie Reilly	1993	52	—	—	—	—	—	—	—	—	—	Elements – The Best of Mike Oldfield
"Hibernaculum"		1994	47	—	—	—	—	—	—	—	—	—	The Songs of Distant Earth
"Let There Be Light"		1995	51	—	—	—	—	—	—	—	—	—	The Songs of Distant Earth
"Women of Ireland"		1997	70	—	—	—	—	—	—	—	—	—	Voyager
"Man in the Rain"	Cara Dillon, and additionally Heather Burnett	1998	98	—	—	—	94	—	—	—	—	—	Tubular Bells III
"Far Above the Clouds"	Clodagh Simonds	1999	53	—	—	—	—	—	—	—	—	—	Tubular Bells III
"To Be Free"	Jude Sim	2002	—	—	25	—	—	—	—	3	—	—	Tres Lunas
"Thou Art in Heaven"	Sally Oldfield	2002	—	—	—	—	—	—	—	17	—	—	Tres Lunas
"Spheres"	Hayley Westenra	2008	—	—	—	—	—	—	—	—	—	—	Music of the Spheres
"Tubular Bells/In Dulci Jubilo" (Note: Released as download and limited edition vinyl as Music from the Opening Ceremony of the 2012 London Olympic Games.)		2012	—	—	—	—	—	—	—	—	—	—	Isles of Wonder
"Sailing"	Luke Spiller	2014	118	—	—	—	—	—	—	—	—	—	Man on the Rocks
"Moonshine"	Luke Spiller	2014	—	—	—	—	—	—	—	—	—	—	Man on the Rocks
"—" denotes releases that did not chart or were not released in that territory.

=== Promotional singles ===
Title	Year	Album
"Hergest Ridge" (Note: Released as a promotional single in the UK, US, Australia and Japan.)	1974	Hergest Ridge
"Extract from The Orchestral Tubular Bells" (Note: Released as a promotional single in the UK and Australia.)	1975	The Orchestral Tubular Bells
"Foreign Affair" (Note: Released as a promotional single in Argentina.)	1983	Crises
"Discovery" (Note: Released as a promotional single in Canada.)	1984	Discovery
"The Wind Chimes" (Note: Released as a promotional single in the US.)	1987	Islands
"Blue Night" (Note: Released as a promotional single in Spain.)	1989	Earth Moving
"Nothing But"	1989	Earth Moving
"Hostage"	1989	Earth Moving
"Tubular Bells" (edit)	1990	Tubular Bells
"Amarok X-Trax" (Note: Released as a promotional single in the UK and Germany.)	1990	Amarok
"Tubular Bells"/"Moonlight Shadow" (Note: Released as a promotional single in the Netherlands.)	1993	Elements – The Best of Mike Oldfield
"Tubular Bells"	1993	Elements – The Best of Mike Oldfield
"Moonlight Shadow"	1993	Elements – The Best of Mike Oldfield
"Ommadawn"	1993	Elements – The Best of Mike Oldfield
"Family Man"	1993	Elements – The Best of Mike Oldfield
"To France"	1993	Elements – The Best of Mike Oldfield
"Islands"	1993	Elements – The Best of Mike Oldfield
"Five Miles Out"	1994	Elements – The Best of Mike Oldfield
"Foreign Affair"	1994	Elements – The Best of Mike Oldfield
"Heaven's Open"	1994	Elements – The Best of Mike Oldfield
"A Shot of Moonshine" (Note: Released as a promotional single in the UK. Credited to MOT2.)	1994	Non-album single
"The Voyager"	1996	Voyager
"Mont St. Michel"	1996	Voyager
"The Song of the Sun"	1996	Voyager
"The Top of the Morning"	1998	Tubular Bells III
"Cochise"	1999	Guitars
"Out of Mind"	1999	Guitars
"Pacha Mama"	1999	The Millennium Bell
"Amber Light" (Note: Released as a promotional single in Germany and Spain.)	1999	The Millennium Bell
"Introduction" (Note: Released as a promotional single in the UK and Europe.)	2003	Tubular Bells 2003
"Surfing"	2005	Light + Shade
"Mike Oldfield's Single" (Note: Released as a promotional single for Record Store Day and the 40th Anniversary of Virgin and Tubular Bells)	2013	Tubular Bells
"Nuclear" (Note: Released as a Record Store Day exclusive.)	2016	Man on the Rocks

== Music videos ==
Year	Title	Album
1975	"Don Alfonso" (with David Bedford)	non-album
1975	"In Dulci Jubilo"	non-album
1976	"Portsmouth"	non-album
1977	"William Tell Overture"	non-album
1979	"Guilty"	non-album
1979	"Blue Peter"	non-album
1980	"Wonderful Land"	QE2
1982	"Five Miles Out"	Five Miles Out
1983	"Moonlight Shadow"	Crises
1983	"Shadow on the Wall"	Crises
1984	"Crime of Passion"	non-album
1984	"To France"	Discovery
1984	"Tricks of the Light"	Discovery
1984	"Étude"	The Killing Fields
1985	"Pictures in the Dark"	non-album
1986	"Shine"	non-album
1988	"The Wind Chimes"	Islands
1988	"North Point"	Islands
1988	"Islands"	Islands
1988	"The Time Has Come"	Islands
1988	"Flying Start"	Islands
1988	"Magic Touch"	Islands
1989	"Innocent"	Earth Moving
1989	"Earth Moving"	Earth Moving
1991	"Heaven's Open"	Heaven's Open
1992	"Sentinel"	Tubular Bells II
1993	"The Bell" (feat. Vivian Stanshall)	Tubular Bells II
1994	"Hibernaculum"	The Songs of Distant Earth
1995	"In the Beginning"/"Let There Be Light"	The Songs of Distant Earth
1997	"Women of Ireland" (remix)	Voyager
2002	"To Be Free"	Tres Lunas
2003	"Introduction 2003"	Tubular Bells 2003
2014	"Sailing"	Man on the Rocks
2014	"Man on the Rocks" (Acoustic and electric versions)	Man on the Rocks
2014	"Moonshine"	Man on the Rocks
2015	"Zombies (Halloween Special)"	The 1984 Suite
2023	"Tubular Bells 4 Intro (Edit)"	Tubular Bells (50th Anniversary Edition)
