= Elements Box =

Box set by Mike Oldfield
- Released: 10 November 1993
- Recorded: 1972–1991
- Genre: Progressive rock
- Label: Virgin
- Producers: Mike Oldfield and others

Mike Oldfield chronology
Elements – The Best of Mike Oldfield (1993)	Elements Box (1993)	XXV: The Essential (1997)

Elements Box is a 4CD box set by Mike Oldfield released in 1993.

== Disc artwork ==
Each CD covers a different period of time in Oldfield's work and has a different cover; disc one's cover is red, depicting fire, disc two's cover is blue, depicting water, disc three's cover is also blue, depicting the sky (i.e. air) and disc four's cover is green depicting a plant and seeds (i.e. earth) - the four elements.

== Track listing ==
=== Disc 1 ===
1. "Tubular Bells Part 1"
2. "Tubular Bells Part 2"
3. "Hergest Ridge" (Excerpt)
4. "In Dulci Jubilo"
5. "Portsmouth"
6. "Vivaldi Concerto in C"

=== Disc 2 ===
1. "Ommadawn" (Part 1)
2. "On Horseback"
3. "William Tell Overture"
4. "Argiers"
5. "First Excursion"
6. "Sailor's Hornpipe"
7. "Incantations" Part Two (Excerpt, including "The Song of Hiawatha")
8. "Guilty"
9. "The Path"
10. "Blue Peter"
11. "Woodhenge"
12. "Punkadiddle" (Live)
13. "Polka" (Live)

=== Disc 3 ===
1. "Platinum" (Parts 3 and 4) – 8:03
2. "Arrival" – 2:47
3. "Taurus I" – 10:18
4. "QE2" – 7:39
5. "Wonderful Land" (single edit) – 2:52
6. "Sheba" – 3:33
7. "Five Miles Out" – 4:18
8. "Taurus II" (Excerpt) – 8:00
9. "Family Man" – 3:47
10. "Mount Teide" – 4:13
11. "Waldberg (The Peak)" – 3:25
12. "Crises" (Excerpt) – 5:25
13. "Moonlight Shadow" – 3:37
14. "Foreign Affair" – 3:54

=== Disc 4 ===
1. "Shadow on the Wall" (12'' single version) – 5:10
2. "Taurus 3" – 2:26
3. "Crime of Passion" – 3:38
4. "Jungle Gardenia" – 2:45
5. "To France" – 4:44
6. "Afghan" – 2:46
7. "Tricks of the Light" (Instrumental) – 3:56
8. "Étude" (7'' edit) – 3:07
9. "Evacuation" – 5:13
10. "Legend" – 2:24
11. "Islands" – 4:19
12. "The Wind Chimes" (Part 1) – 2:30
13. "Flying Start" – 3:37
14. "Magic Touch" [Jim Price vocal version] – 4:14
15. "Earth Moving" – 3:59
16. "Far Country" – 4:25
17. "(One Glance Is) Holy" (Remix) – 3:46
18. "Amarok" (Excerpt, all of "Africa I") – 6:18
19. "Heaven's Open" – 4:28

== Other Elements albums ==
- Elements – The Best of Mike Oldfield, single CD edition
- Elements – The Best of Mike Oldfield (video), video/DVD edition
