= Two Sides =

Two Sides: The Very Best Of Mike Oldfield

Compilation album by Mike Oldfield
- Released: 30 July 2012
- Recorded: 1973 – 2008
- Genres: Progressive rock, pop rock, new-age
- Length: 156:27
- Labels: Mercury; Universal
- Producers: Mike Oldfield; Simon Phillips; Tom Newman; Trevor Horn; Karl Jenkins; Alan Shacklock; Geoffrey Downes

Mike Oldfield chronology
The Mike Oldfield Collection 1974–1983 (2009)	Two Sides: The Very Best Of Mike Oldfield (2012)	Icon (2012)

Two Sides: The Very Best of Mike Oldfield is a compilation album by British multi-instrumentalist Mike Oldfield that was released on 30 July 2012 by Mercury Records.

== Background and release ==
The content of the album was compiled by Oldfield himself. The album cover features two depictions of Oldfield's signature Tubular Bells logo, one in bright pink and the other in dark blue, on a blue night's sky background. It was released on the same day as a number of other Oldfield releases; QE2 and Platinum remasters, and a 6 CD boxed set.

The release came days after Oldfield's performance at the 2012 Summer Olympics opening ceremony. The exact version of Tubular Bells that Oldfield performed at the opening ceremony is not on this album, but is available on Isles of Wonder: Music for the Opening Ceremony of the London 2012 Olympic Games.

Additionally in August 2012 Universal and Indaba Music created a Tubular Bells remix contest, where users could download original stem recordings to create their own pieces. The winner of the $1000 prize was judged by Oldfield.

== Charts ==
The album charted at 6 in the UK Albums Chart on 5 August 2012.

Chart (2012)	Position
Polish Albums Chart	39
Spanish Albums Chart	38
UK Albums Chart	6

== Certifications ==
Region	Certification	Certified units/sales
Germany (BVMI)	Gold	100,000^{‡}
^{‡} Sales+streaming figures based on certification alone.

== Track listing ==
All songs written by Mike Oldfield, except where noted.

=== Disc one ===
No.	Title	Place of Origin	Length
1.	"Tubular Bells (Part One)" (Two Sides excerpt)	Tubular Bells, 1973	13:30
2.	"Ommadawn (Part One)" (Two Sides excerpt)	Ommadawn, 1975	6:48
3.	"Crises" (Two Sides excerpt)	Crises, 1983	10:30
4.	"The Lake" (Two Sides excerpt)	Discovery, 1984	5:30
5.	"Amarok (Part One)" (Two Sides excerpt)	Amarok, 1990	5:05
6.	"Amarok (Part Two)" (Two Sides excerpt)	Amarok	15:17
7.	"Sentinel"	Tubular Bells II, 1992	8:09
8.	"Supernova"	The Songs of Distant Earth, 1994	3:24
9.	"Ascension"	The Songs of Distant Earth	5:51
10.	"The Tempest"	Music of the Spheres, 2008	5:48

=== Disc two ===
No.	Title	Place of Origin	Length
1.	"Guilty"	Non-album single, 1979	4:15
2.	"Family Man" (with Maggie Reilly) (Oldfield, Tim Cross, Rick Fenn, Mike Frye, Maggie Reilly, Morris Pert)	Five Miles Out, 1982	3:48
3.	"Five Miles Out"	Five Miles Out	4:19
4.	"Moonlight Shadow" (with Maggie Reilly)	Crises	3:39
5.	"Shadow on the Wall" (with Roger Chapman)	Crises	3:10
6.	"To France" (with Maggie Reilly)	Discovery	4:41
7.	"Etude" (Francisco Tárrega)	The Killing Fields, 1984	4:39
8.	"Magic Touch"	Islands, 1987	4:17
9.	"Islands" (with Bonnie Tyler)	Islands	4:20
10.	"Heaven's Open"	Heaven's Open, 1991	4:31
11.	"Tattoo (Live At Edinburgh Castle, 1992)"	Tubular Bells II	3:47
12.	"The Song of the Sun" (Bieito Romero)	Voyager, 1996	4:34
13.	"Summit Day"	Guitars, 1999	3:47
14.	"Lake Constance"	The Millennium Bell, 1999	5:18
15.	"Broad Sunlit Uplands"	The Millennium Bell	4:05
16.	"The Doge's Palace"	The Millennium Bell	3:08
17.	"Amber Light"	The Millennium Bell	3:47
18.	"Angelique"	Light + Shade, 2005	4:41
19.	"On My Heart" (with Hayley Westenra)	Music of the Spheres	2:28
