= Elements – The Best of Mike Oldfield =

Greatest hits album by Mike Oldfield
- Released: 13 September 1993
- Recorded: 1972–1992
- Genre: Progressive rock
- Length: 63:22
- Label: Virgin
- Producer: Mike Oldfield; Tom Newman; Simon Heyworth; Simon Phillips; Alan Shacklock; Trevor Horn

Mike Oldfield chronology
Collector's Edition Box (1993)	Elements – The Best of Mike Oldfield (1993)	Elements Box (1993)

Singles from Elements – The Best of Mike Oldfield
- 1. "Moonlight Shadow" Released: 27 September 1993; 2. "In Dulci Jubilo" Released: 22 November 1993

Elements – The Best of Mike Oldfield is a compilation album by English musician Mike Oldfield, released in 1993 by Virgin Records.

The compilation was first released as a single CD album, which is the most commonly available form today. It was later released with Oldfield's original Tubular Bells album (1973), as a double CD. Other related releases include a 4-CD box set and a video album.

Elements was released by Virgin after Oldfield had left the label, but includes "Sentinel" from Tubular Bells II (1992) courtesy of the Warner label.

Two of Oldfield's previous hits, "In Dulci Jubilo" and "Moonlight Shadow", were reissued as singles alongside the album. The latter reissue reached number 52 in the UK singles chart.

== Track listing ==
All tracks written by Mike Oldfield, except where noted.

No.	Title	Writer(s)	Origin	Length
1.	"Tubular Bells (Opening theme)"		Tubular Bells (1973)	4:19
2.	"Family Man" (featuring Maggie Reilly)	Oldfield; Reilly; Tim Cross; Rick Fenn; Mike Frye; Morris Pert	Five Miles Out (1982)	3:45
3.	"Moonlight Shadow" (featuring Maggie Reilly)		Crises (1983)	3:36
4.	"Heaven's Open"		Heaven's Open (1991)	4:27
5.	"Five Miles Out"		Five Miles Out	4:15
6.	"To France" (featuring Maggie Reilly)		Discovery (1984)	4:43
7.	"Foreign Affair" (featuring Maggie Reilly)	Oldfield; Reilly	Crises	3:54
8.	"In Dulci Jubilo"	trad.	non-album single (1975)	2:50
9.	"Shadow on the Wall" (12" version; featuring Roger Chapman)		Crises	5:07
10.	"Islands" (featuring Bonnie Tyler)		Islands (1987)	4:17
11.	"Etude"	Francisco Tárrega	The Killing Fields soundtrack (1984)	3:07
12.	"Sentinel" (Single version)		Tubular Bells II (1992)	3:56
13.	"Ommadawn (Excerpt)"		Ommadawn (1975)	3:38
14.	"Incantations part four (Excerpt)"		Incantations (1978)	4:39
15.	"Amarok (Excerpt)"		Amarok (1990)	4:43
16.	"Portsmouth"	trad.	non-album single (1976)	2:00

== Personnel ==
Adapted from the album's liner notes.

Producers

- Mike Oldfield (tracks 1–3, 5–14, 16)
- Tom Newman (tracks 1, 4, 5, 10, 12, 15)
- Simon Heyworth (track 1)
- Simon Phillips (tracks 3, 6, 7, 9)
- Alan Shacklock (track 10)
- Trevor Horn (track 12)

Additional personnel

- Remastered by Chris Blair at Abbey Road (London, England)
- Design & art direction: Bill Smith Studio
- Photography: Lewis Mulatero

== Charts ==
=== Weekly charts ===
Weekly chart performance for Elements – The Best of Mike Oldfield
Chart (1993)	Peak position
Austrian Albums (Ö3 Austria)	24
Dutch Albums (Album Top 100)	54
German Albums (Offizielle Top 100)	13
Hungarian Albums (MAHASZ)	13
Spanish Albums (PROMUSICAE)	5
Swedish Albums (Sverigetopplistan)	4
Swiss Albums (Schweizer Hitparade)	21
UK Albums (Official Charts)	5

=== Year-end charts ===
1993 year-end chart performance for Elements – The Best of Mike Oldfield
Chart (1993)	Position
Spanish Albums (AFYVE)	31

== Certifications ==
Sales and certifications for Elements – The Best of Mike Oldfield
Region	Certification	Certified units/sales
France (SNEP)	Gold	100,000^{*}
Germany (BVMI)	Gold	250,000^{^}
Spain (Promusicae)	2× Platinum	200,000^{^}
Switzerland (IFPI Switzerland)	Gold	25,000^{^}
United Kingdom (BPI)	Gold	100,000^{^}
^{*} Sales figures based on certification alone.^{^} Shipments figures based on certification alone.

== Musical scores ==
- Oldfield, Mike (1994). Elements. The Best of Mike Oldfield. Piano/Vocal/Guitar. IMP International Music Publications Limited. ISBN 1-85909-157-1.

== Other Elements albums ==
- Elements – The Best of Mike Oldfield (video), video/DVD edition
- Elements Box, by Mike Oldfield, four CD edition
