= The Mike Oldfield Collection 1974–1983 =

Compilation album by Mike Oldfield
- Released: 8 June 2009 (UK: 0602527035505)
- Recorded: 1972–1983
- Genre: Progressive rock
- Length: 112:43
- Label: Mercury
- Producer: Mike Oldfield

Mike Oldfield chronology
The Platinum Collection (2006)	The Mike Oldfield Collection 1974–1983 (2009)	Two Sides (2012)

The Mike Oldfield Collection 1974–1983 is a compilation album by Mike Oldfield, released in 2009, to coincide with the reissue of Oldfield's debut album, Tubular Bells, by Mercury Records.

== Release ==
It was released on 8 June 2009 in the UK as a 2CD package, with the new mix of the Tubular Bells album, along with related bonus tracks, taking up the whole of disc one. The album contains recordings that were originally released by Virgin Records.

It was advertised on television, where the actor Tom Baker, known for his role as the Doctor in Doctor Who, provided a voice-over. The advert featured short excerpts from "Moonlight Shadow" and "Family Man" as well as Tubular Bells. Some versions of the advert also carried a tag-line on the end, as a promotion for Father's Day gifts at the Asda chain of supermarkets. Tom Baker had previously provided a voice-over for The Best of Tubular Bells advert in 2000.

The album was BBC Radio 2's record of the week for the week commencing 15 June 2009. With being a record of the week, Radio 2 played "Family Man" on Monday, "Moonlight Shadow" on Tuesday, "Foreign Affair" on Wednesday, Tubular Bells on Thursday, and "Five Miles Out" on Friday.

== Charts ==
The Collection charted at number 11 in the UK Albums Chart during its second week, after entering the chart at number 25.

Chart (2009)	Position
UK Albums Chart	11

== Track listing ==
=== Disc one – Tubular Bells ===
1. "Tubular Bells Part One" (New stereo mix by Mike Oldfield, Bahamas, March 2009) - 22:58
2. "Tubular Bells Part Two" (New stereo mix by Mike Oldfield, Bahamas, March 2009) - 23:20
3. "Mike Oldfield's Single" - 3:53
4. "Sailor's Hornpipe" (Vivian Stanshall version) - 2:48

=== Disc two – The Collection ===
1. "In Dulci Jubilo" - 2:49
2. "Ommadawn" (excerpt) - 3:41
3. "Portsmouth" - 2:04
4. "William Tell Overture" - 3:56
5. "Incantations Part Four" (excerpt) - 4:40
6. "Guilty" (long version) - 6:46
7. "Blue Peter" - 2:06
8. "Five Miles Out" - 4:17
9. "Wonderful Land" - 3:41
10. "Taurus II" (excerpt) - 11:16
11. "Family Man" - 3:47
12. "Shadow on the Wall" - 3:09
13. "Moonlight Shadow" - 3:38
14. "Foreign Affair" - 3:54
