= Music Wonderland =

Compilation album by Mike Oldfield
- Released: 1981
- Recorded: 1972–1979
- Genre: Progressive rock
- Label: Virgin Records
- Producer: Mike Oldfield and others

Mike Oldfield chronology
| Mike Oldfield's Wonderland (1980) | Music Wonderland (1981) | Episodes (1981) |

Music Wonderland is a compilation album by Mike Oldfield released in 1981 on Virgin Records. The album has since been reissued worldwide on CD.

Another compilation released the previous year, Mike Oldfield's Wonderland, has not been reissued since; this is considered its reissue, although it has a different track listing.

== Track listing ==
=== Side one ===
1. "Arrival" – 2:48
2. "Portsmouth" – 2:02
3. "Sheba" – 3:34
4. "Blue Peter" – 2:08
5. "Tubular Bells" (extract from part one) – 8:32
6. "The Sailor's Hornpipe" – 1:34
7. "Punkadiddle" (edit with no intro) – 4:58

=== Side two ===
1. "Wonderful Land" – 3:39
2. "In Dulci Jubilo" – 2:50
3. "Ommadawn" (extract from part one) – 7:06
4. "On Horseback" – 3:25
5. "Guilty" (live-edit) – 3:41
6. "North Star / Platinum Finale" – 4:44

== Charts ==
=== Weekly charts ===
| Chart (1981) | Peak position |
|---|---|
| Dutch Albums (Album Top 100) | 12 |
| German Albums (Offizielle Top 100) | 5 |

=== Year-end charts ===
| Chart (1981) | Position |
|---|---|
| Dutch Albums (Album Top 100) | 62 |

== Certifications ==
| Region | Certification | Certified units/sales |
|---|---|---|
| Germany (BVMI) | Gold | 250,000^{^} |
^{^} Shipments figures based on certification alone.
