= The Complete Tubular Bells =

Box set by Mike Oldfield
- Released: 26 May 2003
- Genre: Progressive rock
- Label: WEA
- Producer: Mike Oldfield, Trevor Horn, Tom Newman

Mike Oldfield chronology
| Collection (2002) | The Complete Tubular Bells (2003) | The Platinum Collection (2006) |

Tubular Bells series chronology
| The Best of Tubular Bells (2001) | The Complete Tubular Bells (2003) | Tubular Bells 2003 (2003) |

The Complete Tubular Bells is a compilation album that comprises the three main releases under the name of Tubular Bells by Mike Oldfield, released in 2003 alongside Tubular Bells 2003.

This box set includes Tubular Bells 2003 (a re-recording of the original Tubular Bells), Tubular Bells II and Tubular Bells III. A bonus DVD is also included, the same that was released with the album Tubular Bells 2003.

== Track listing ==
=== CD 1: Tubular Bells 2003 ===
Part one

1. "Introduction" – 5:52
2. "Fast Guitars" – 1:04
3. "Basses" – 0:46
4. "Latin" – 2:18
5. "A Minor Tune" – 1:21
6. "Blues" – 2:40
7. "Thrash" – 0:44
8. "Jazz" – 0:48
9. "Ghost Bells" – 0:30
10. "Russian" – 0:44
11. "Finale" – 8:32 (featuring John Cleese)

Part two

12. "Harmonics" – 5:12
13. "Peace" – 3:30
14. "Bagpipe Guitars" – 3:08
15. "Caveman" – 4:33
16. "Ambient Guitars" – 5:10
17. "The Sailor's Hornpipe" – 1:46 (Traditional arrangement)

=== CD 2: Tubular Bells II ===
1. "Sentinel" – 8:07
2. "Dark Star" – 2:16
3. "Clear Light" – 5:48
4. "Blue Saloon" – 2:59
5. "Sunjammer" – 2:32
6. "Red Dawn" – 1:50
7. "The Bell" – 6:59
8. "Weightless" – 5:43
9. "The Great Plain" – 4:47
10. "Sunset Door" – 2:23
11. "Tattoo" – 4:15
12. "Altered State" – 5:12
13. "Maya Gold" – 4:01
14. "Moonshine" – 1:42

=== CD 3: Tubular Bells III ===
1. "The Source of Secrets" – 5:35
2. "The Watchful Eye" – 2:09
3. "Jewel in the Crown" – 5:45
4. "Outcast" – 3:49
5. "Serpent Dream" – 2:53
6. "The Inner Child" – 4:41
7. "Man in the Rain" – 4:03
8. "The Top of the Morning" – 4:26
9. "Moonwatch" – 4:25
10. "Secrets" – 3:20
11. "Far Above the Clouds" – 5:30

=== Bonus DVD ===
1. "Introduction" – 5:51
2. "Fast Guitars" – 1:04
3. "Basses" – 0:46
4. "Introduction 2003" 'The video' – 3:41
