= The Platinum Collection (Mike Oldfield album) =

Greatest hits album by Mike Oldfield
- Released: 13 March 2006
- Recorded: 1972 – 2002
- Genre: Progressive rock
- Length: 3:30:22
- Label: Virgin
- Producer: Mike Oldfield

Mike Oldfield chronology
The Complete Tubular Bells (2003)	The Platinum Collection (2006)	The Mike Oldfield Collection 1974–1983 (2009)

Professional ratings
Review scores
Source	Rating
Allmusic	3/5 stars

The Platinum Collection is a 2006 Virgin Records compilation album written and mostly performed by Mike Oldfield. It contains most of Oldfield's best known work, and some rare mixes of songs that had previously only been available as B-sides to singles.

The first two discs are entirely made up of content from Oldfield's Virgin albums, whereas some pieces on disc three are under licence from Warner.

== Charts ==
It charted at number 36 in the UK Albums Chart but left the charts after only three weeks. It also peaked at number 12 in the Spanish Album Charts.

Chart (2006)	Position
UK Albums Chart	36
Spanish Album Charts	12

== Track listing ==
=== Disc one ===
1. "Tubular Bells" (Opening theme)
2. "Tubular Bells" (Part 1) (Final excerpt)
3. "The Sailor's Hornpipe"
4. "Hergest Ridge" (Part 1) (Intro excerpt)
5. "Ommadawn" (Part 1) (Intro excerpt)
6. "Ommadawn" (Part 1) (Final excerpt)
7. "In Dulci Jubilo"
8. "Don Alfonso"
9. "Portsmouth"
10. "William Tell Overture"
11. "Cuckoo Song"
12. "Incantations" (Part 4) (Final excerpt)
13. "Platinum" (Part 4)
14. "Woodhenge"

=== Disc two ===
1. "Moonlight Shadow" (Extended version)
2. "Blue Peter"
3. "Guilty" (Long version)
4. "Arrival"
5. "Wonderful Land"
6. "Sheba"
7. "Five Miles Out"
8. "Family Man"
9. "Mistake"
10. "Shadow on the Wall" (Extended version)
11. "Foreign Affair"
12. "In High Places"
13. "Crime of Passion"
14. "Tricks of the Light"
15. "To France" (Extended version)
16. "Étude"
17. "Evacuation" (Also includes the hidden track "Legend")

=== Disc three ===
1. "Sentinel" (Single restructure)
2. "Pictures in the Dark" (Extended version)
3. "Shine" (Extended version)
4. "Islands" (12" mix)
5. "Flying Start" (12" version)
6. "The Time Has Come" (12" version)
7. "Innocent" (12" mix)
8. "Earth Moving" (Club version)
9. "Amarok" (Africa I)
10. "Heaven's Open" (Mistitled as the 12" version, although it is the album version)
11. "Hibernaculum" (Single edit)
12. "Women of Ireland"
13. "Far Above the Clouds" (Single edit)
14. "The Millennium Bell" (Remix)
15. "To Be Free" (Radio edit)
