= The Time Has Come (Mike Oldfield song) =

- The vinyl cover of "The Time Has Come"

Single by Mike Oldfield featuring Anita Hegerland

from the album Islands
- B-side: "The Wind Chimes"; "North Point"
- Released: 9 November 1987
- Recorded: 1986
- Genre: Pop rock
- Length: 3:53
- Label: Virgin Records
- Songwriter(s): Mike Oldfield
- Producer(s): Mike Oldfield; Michael Cretu; Simon Phillips

Mike Oldfield singles chronology
"Islands" (1987)	"The Time Has Come" (1987)	"Magic Touch" (1988)

"The Time Has Come" is a song by multi-instrumentalist Mike Oldfield. It appeared on his 1987 album Islands and was released as the second single from that album.

The song features Oldfield's then partner and former child singer, Anita Hegerland, on vocals and was co-produced by Oldfield and Michael Cretu, later of the Enigma musical project.

== Releases ==
It was released in 1987 by Virgin Records as VS1013 and VST1013 in the United Kingdom, as 505539 in Portugal, as 80351 in France as F-609542 in Spain and as 609542 and 109542 in Germany.

The UK and Portuguese single's b-side was an extract from part two of "The Wind Chimes", whereas in Germany the b-side was "North Point". "The Wind Chimes" was co-produced by Oldfield and drummer Simon Phillips, and "North Point" was produced by Oldfield.

The maxi-single's contain an alternate mix of "The Time Has Come", the 12-inch mix, which is over 30 seconds longer than the normal mix. This 12-inch mix was later released on Oldfield's 2006 compilation album, The Platinum Collection.

The single was performed on a number of European television shows at the time, including West Germany's Peter's Pop Show.

== Music video ==
The Wind Chimes video contains a music video for the song. The video was also made available on the 2004 DVD release of Elements.

The video makes use of basic 3D visuals, including floating objects. Many images in the video are references to the Ancient Egyptians. Hegerland appears in the video in Egyptian-style dress.

== Track listings ==
=== UK/Portugal single ===
Side A

1. "The Time Has Come" – 3:53 (Mike Oldfield)

Side B

1. "Final Extract from The Wind Chimes (part 2)" (Oldfield)

=== German single ===
Side A

1. "The Time Has Come" – 3:53 (Oldfield)

Side B

1. "North Point" – 3:32 (Oldfield)

=== Spain/France/UK maxi-single ===
Side A

1. "The Time Has Come" - 4:25 (Oldfield)

Side B

1. "The Time Has Come" (Original mix) – 3:53 (Oldfield)
2. "Final Extract from The Wind Chimes" (Oldfield)

=== German maxi-single ===
Side A

1. "The Time Has Come" - 4:25 (Oldfield)

Side B

1. "The Time Has Come" (Original mix) – 3:53 (Oldfield)
2. "North Point" – 3:32 (Oldfield)
