= Elements – The Best of Mike Oldfield (video) =

Elements - The Best of Mike Oldfield

Video by Mike Oldfield
- Released: October 1993 (VHS & Laserdisc); 29 November 2004 (DVD)
- Recorded: 1972–1991
- Genres: Progressive rock, new-age, pop
- Length: 93:04 (DVD)
- Label: Virgin
- Producers: Mike Oldfield and others

Mike Oldfield chronology
Tubular Bells II Live (1992)	Elements - The Best of Mike Oldfield (1993)	Tubular Bells III Live (1998)

Elements - The Best of Mike Oldfield is a video collection by Mike Oldfield released in October 1993. It was released by Virgin Records on VHS and LaserDisc. A DVD edition of the video release, including additional extras, was produced in 2004.

== Video ==
The video also includes material from two tracks from Tubular Bells II, an album which Oldfield produced for Warner Music, his then current record label, and some versions included bonus material.

=== Track listing ===
1. "Ommadawn" (excerpt used as opening theme)
2. "Tubular Bells" (excerpt from part one - live)
3. "In Dulci Jubilo"
4. "Incantations" (excerpt from part four)
5. "Étude"
6. "Five Miles Out"
7. "Moonlight Shadow"
8. "Islands"
9. "Shadow on the Wall"
10. "Sentinel" (restructure)
11. "Tattoo" (live at Edinburgh Castle)
12. "Ommadawn" (excerpt used as closing theme)

=== Bonus material ===
- Tubular Bells Live from BBC Second House
- An excerpt of "Incantations" from The Space Movie
- An exclusive interview

== DVD ==
Although the DVD was released in 2004, it only features the works which Oldfield produced when he was signed to Virgin Records (until 1991). The DVD also includes The Wind Chimes video release as a bonus feature.

=== Track listing ===
1. "Tubular Bells" (Part 1) – Live (Second House BBC TV performance - 1973) (24:59)
2. "Don Alfonso" (4:29)
3. "In Dulci Jubilo" (3:05)
4. "Portsmouth" (2:03)
5. "William Tell Overture" (3:54)
6. "Guilty" (4:11)
7. "Blue Peter" (2:19)
8. "Wonderful Land" (2:53)
9. "Five Miles Out" (4:17)
10. "Moonlight Shadow" (3:43)
11. "Shadow on the Wall" (3:12)
12. "Crime of Passion" (3:42)
13. "Tricks of the Light" (3:56)
14. "To France" (4:30)
15. "Étude" (2:24)
16. "Pictures in the Dark" (5:10)
17. "Shine" (3:24)
18. "Innocent" (3:31)
19. "Earth Moving" (4:04)
20. "Heaven's Open" (3:18)

=== Extras ===
- "The Space Movie (Incantations)"
- The Wind Chimes
  - "The Wind Chimes"
  - "North Point"
  - "Islands"
  - "The Time Has Come"
  - "Flying Start"
  - "Magic Touch"
- "Mike Oldfield Interview"

== Other Elements albums ==
- Elements – The Best of Mike Oldfield, single CD edition
- Elements Box, by Mike Oldfield, four CD editions
