= The Best of Tubular Bells =

Greatest hits album by Mike Oldfield
- Released: 4 June 2001
- Recorded: 1972–1998
- Genre: Progressive rock
- Length: 62:13
- Label: Virgin
- Producer: Mike Oldfield; Simon Hayworth; Tom Newman; David Bedford; Phillip R Newell; Trevor Horn

Mike Oldfield chronology
XXV: The Essential (1997)	The Best of Tubular Bells (2001)	Collection (2002)

Tubular Bells series chronology
The Millennium Bell (1999)	The Best of Tubular Bells (2001)	The Complete Tubular Bells (2003)

The Best of Tubular Bells is a compilation album written and mostly performed by Mike Oldfield. It was released in 2001 and features segments from all of the Tubular Bells albums up to that year.

It is a single CD which consists of pieces of various past versions of Tubular Bells albums; Tubular Bells (1973), The Orchestral Tubular Bells (1975), Tubular Bells live (1979), Tubular Bells II (1992), Tubular Bells III (1998) and The Millennium Bell (1999). The album has been re-edited so that the changes between most of the different parts of Tubular Bells are seamless.

It was advertised on television in 2001, where the actor Tom Baker, known for his role as the Doctor in Doctor Who, provides his voice-over.

== Track listing ==
1. "Tubular Bells" - Part 1 (Original edit) - 4:42
2. "Tubular Bells" - Part 1 (Orchestral edit) - 3:14
3. "Tubular Bells" - Part 1 (Original edit) - 3:47
4. "Tubular Bells" - Part 1 (Exposed edit) - 3:20
5. "Tubular Bells" - Part 1 (Original edit) - 8:29
6. "Tubular Bells" - Part 2 "The Caveman Song" (Original edit) - 4:46
7. "Tubular Bells" - Part 2 (Exposed edit) - 4:15
8. "Sentinel" (Tubular Bells II) - 8:07
9. "The Bell" (Tubular Bells II) - 6:59
10. "Far Above The Clouds" (Tubular Bells III) - 5:28
11. "The Millennium Bell" (The Millennium Bell) - 7:32
12. "Tubular Bells" - Part 2 "Sailor's Hornpipe" (Original edit) - 1:34
