= Mike Oldfield albums discography =

Mike Oldfield discography
- Studio albums: 25
- Extended plays: 6
- Soundtrack albums: 1
- Live albums: 1
- Compilation albums: 14
- Video albums: 11
- Orchestral arrangements: 1
- Remix albums: 2
- Box sets: 7

This is the albums discography of English musician Mike Oldfield.

== Studio albums ==
Title	Album details	Peak chart positions										Certifications
Title	Album details	UK	AUS	AUT	CAN	GER	NL	SPA	SWE	SWI	US	Certifications
Tubular Bells	Released: 25 May 1973; Label: Virgin; Formats: LP, MC, 8-track, reel-to-reel	1	1	67 (Note: Chart peak for the 2023 50th Anniversary Edition re-release.)	1	22	2	4	—	21	3	BPI: 9× Platinum; ARIA: 3× Platinum; MC: 2× Platinum; NVPI: Gold; RIAA: Gold
Hergest Ridge	Released: 30 August 1974; Label: Virgin; Formats: LP, MC, 8-track	1	12	—	91	—	12	54 (Note: Chart peak in 2010.)	11	—	87	BPI: Gold
Ommadawn	Released: 7 November 1975; Label: Virgin; Formats: LP, MC, 8-track	4	60	—	74	—	2	5	42	—	146	BPI: Gold; NVPI: Gold
Incantations	Released: 1 December 1978; Label: Virgin; Formats: 2×LP, MC	14	54	—	—	41	27	9	32	—	—	BPI: Platinum
Platinum	Released: 23 November 1979; Label: Virgin; Formats: LP, MC; Released in North America as Airborn	24	98	17	—	11	—	27	—	—	—	BPI: Gold; BVMI: Gold; PROMUSICAE: Platinum
QE2	Released: 31 October 1980; Label: Virgin; Formats: LP, MC	27	23	8	—	12	—	45 (Note: Chart peak in 2012.)	—	—	174	BPI: Gold; BVMI: Gold; PROMUSICAE: Gold
Five Miles Out	Released: 19 March 1982; Label: Virgin; Formats: LP, MC	7	16	10	29	7	34	3	5	—	164	BPI: Gold; BVMI: Gold; PROMUSICAE: Platinum
Crises	Released: 27 May 1983; Label: Virgin; Formats: CD, LP, MC	6	17	2	57	1	2	1	1	5	—	BPI: Gold; BVMI: Platinum; NVPI: Gold; PROMUSICAE: Platinum
Discovery	Released: 25 June 1984; Label: Virgin; Formats: CD, LP, MC	15	56	3	44	1	2	1	3	1	—	BPI: Gold; BVMI: Gold; PROMUSICAE: Gold
Islands	Released: 28 September 1987; Label: Virgin; Formats: CD, LP, MC	29	—	10	—	9	71	4	12	4	138	BPI: Gold; BVMI: Gold; IFPI SWI: Gold; PROMUSICAE: Gold
Earth Moving	Released: 10 July 1989; Label: Virgin; Formats: CD, LP, MC	30	—	21	—	1	55	21	21	3	—	BVMI: Gold; IFPI SWI: Gold; PROMUSICAE: Gold
Amarok	Released: 21 May 1990; Label: Virgin; Formats: CD, LP, MC	49	—	26	—	16	66	27	50	30	—	
Heaven's Open	Released: 18 February 1991; Label: Virgin; Formats: CD, LP, MC	—	—	—	—	13	80	—	—	16	—	
Tubular Bells II	Released: 31 August 1992; Label: WEA; Formats: CD, LP, MC	1	12	4	—	7	15	1	18	19	—	BPI: 2× Platinum; BVMI: Gold; PROMUSICAE: 5× Platinum
The Songs of Distant Earth	Released: 21 November 1994; Label: WEA; Formats: CD, LP, MC	24	—	20	—	33	81	1	12	23	—	BPI: Gold; PROMUSICAE: 2× Platinum
Voyager	Released: 26 August 1996; Label: WEA; Formats: CD, MC, LP	12	—	16	—	15	41	1	13	15	—	BPI: Gold; PROMUSICAE: 3× Platinum
Tubular Bells III	Released: 31 August 1998; Label: WEA; Formats: CD, MC, LP	4	96	4	—	9	46	1	31	26	—	BPI: Gold; PROMUSICAE: 4× Platinum
Guitars	Released: 24 May 1999; Label: WEA; Formats: CD, MC, LP	40	—	35	—	16	—	3	—	34	—	PROMUSICAE: Platinum
The Millennium Bell	Released: 26 November 1999; Label: WEA; Formats: CD, MC, LP	133	—	43	—	39	—	5	—	94	—	PROMUSICAE: Platinum
Tres Lunas	Released: 3 June 2002; Label: WEA; Formats: CD, MC	—	—	8	—	19	—	5	32	44	—	PROMUSICAE: Platinum
Tubular Bells 2003	Released: 27 May 2003; Label: WEA; Formats: CD, MC, LP	51	—	—	—	29	41	11	—	55	—	
Light + Shade	Released: 26 September 2005; Label: Mercury; Formats: 2×CD	175	—	—	—	26	—	9	—	76	—	
Music of the Spheres	Released: 17 March 2008; Label: Universal Classics and Jazz, Mercury; Formats: CD	9	—	62	—	14	—	7	31	37	—	BPI: Silver
Man on the Rocks	Released: 3 March 2014; Label: Virgin EMI; Formats: CD, 2×LP, digital download	12	—	10	—	3	16	5	48	9	—	
Return to Ommadawn	Released: 29 January 2017; Label: Virgin EMI; Formats: CD, LP, digital download	4	—	6	—	3	28	1	38	8	—	
"—" denotes releases that did not chart or were not released in that territory.

== Live albums ==
There is only one officially released Oldfield live audio album, Exposed, although others have been released on video: Warner's Sight&Sound edition of The Art in Heaven Concert includes a CD of Oldfield's new millennium live performance in Berlin; and the special edition of Music of the Spheres also contains the only live performance of the piece by Oldfield (Bilbao 2008).

The North America alternate version of Platinum, Airborn, features a live version of Tubular Bells part one and a live/studio version of Incantations on the second LP. Note, they are not the same recordings as Exposed.

Live CDs were also included in the Mercury Records deluxe editions of Oldfield's albums: Platinum (Live at Wembley Arena, May 1980), QE2 (Live from the European Adventure Tour), Five Miles Out (Live in Cologne – 6 December 1982 – Five Miles Out Tour), Crises (Live at Wembley Arena 22 July 1983 Crises Tour).

Title	Album details	Peak chart positions		Certifications
Title	Album details	UK	GER	Certifications
Exposed	Released: 27 July 1979; Label: Virgin; Formats: 2×LP, MC	16	43	BPI: Silver

== Soundtrack albums ==
The only full film score which Oldfield has written, was for the 1984 film The Killing Fields. Oldfield was commissioned to produce the music for NASA's The Space Movie in 1979; no soundtrack album was released at the time. However a DVD and CD soundtrack (though the CD content is just the audio track from the DVD, including voiceovers and sound effects) were issued in October 2015. He also contributed to the movie soundtrack album on The X-Files, with his rendition of Mark Snow's main theme, entitled "Tubular X".

Title	Album details	Peak chart positions				Certifications
Title	Album details	UK	CAN	GER	SPA	Certifications
The Killing Fields	Released: 26 November 1984; Label: Virgin; Formats: CD, LP, MC	97	90	64	16	BPI: Silver

== Orchestral arrangements ==
In 1975, David Bedford arranged Oldfield's first two albums, Tubular Bells and Hergest Ridge, for orchestra. These were both performed and recorded, but only The Orchestral Tubular Bells was released to the public as an album. Even though The Orchestral Hergest Ridge was not released, sections were used in the soundtrack to The Space Movie.

Title	Album details	Peak chart positions	Certifications
Title	Album details	UK	Certifications
The Orchestral Tubular Bells	Released: January 1975; Label: Virgin; Formats: LP, MC, 8-track	17	BPI: Silver

== Remix albums ==
Title	Album details	Peak chart positions				
Title	Album details	AUT	GER	NL	SPA	SWE
Tubular Beats	Released: 1 February 2013; Label: Ear Music; Formats: CD, digital download	67	55	54	96	55
The 1984 Suite	Released: 29 January 2016; Label: Mercury/Virgin EMI; Formats: LP, digital download	—	—	—	—	—
"—" denotes releases that did not chart or were not released in that territory.

== Compilation albums ==
Title	Album details	Peak chart positions							Certifications
Title	Album details	UK	AUT	GER	NL	SPA	SWE	SWI	Certifications
Music Wonderland	Released: March 1981; Label: Virgin; Formats: LP, MC; Continental Europe-only release	—	—	5	12	—	—	—	BVMI: Gold
Episodes	Released: June 1981; Label: Virgin; Formats: LP, MC; France-only release	—	—	—	—	—	—	—	
The Complete Mike Oldfield	Released: 21 October 1985; Label: Virgin; Formats: 2×CD, 2×LP, 2×MC	36	—	17	—	7	—	27	BPI: Gold; BVMI: Gold; IFPI SWI: Gold; PROMUSICAE: Gold
Elements – The Best of Mike Oldfield	Released: 13 September 1993; Label: Virgin; Formats: CD, LP, MC	5	24	13	54	5	4	21	BPI: Gold; BVMI: Gold; IFPI SWI: Gold; PROMUSICAE: 2× Platinum
XXV: The Essential	Released: 17 November 1997; Label: WEA/Virgin; Formats: CD, MC	78	19	42	—	19	—	—	PROMUSICAE: Gold
The Best of Tubular Bells	Released: 4 June 2001; Label: Virgin; Formats: CD, MC	60	—	—	—	—	—	—	
Collection	Released: February 2002; Label: Virgin; Formats: 2×CD	—	—	—	—	—	—	—	
The Platinum Collection	Released: 13 March 2006; Label: Virgin; Formats: 3×CD	36	—	—	—	12	—	—	
The Mike Oldfield Collection 1974–1983	Released: 8 June 2009; Label: Mercury; Formats: 2×CD	11	—	—	—	—	—	—	
Icon	Released: 31 May 2012; Label: Universal Music; Formats: CD	—	—	—	—	—	—	—	
Two Sides: The Very Best of Mike Oldfield	Released: 30 July 2012; Label: Mercury/Universal Music; Formats: 2×CD, digital download	6	—	22	—	38	—	86	
Moonlight Shadow: The Collection	Released: 22 April 2013; Label: Mercury/Universal Music; Formats: CD, digital download	—	—	—	—	—	—	—	
The Best of 1992–2003	Released: 24 April 2015; Label: Warner Music; Formats: 2×CD, digital download	—	—	—	—	70	—	91	
Lo mejor de...	Released: 10 July 2015; Label: Universal Music; Formats: CD; Spain-only release	—	—	—	—	93	—	—	
"—" denotes releases that did not chart or were not released in that territory.

== Box sets ==
Title	Album details	Peak chart positions	
Title	Album details	UK	SPA
Boxed	Released: 29 October 1976; Label: Virgin; Formats: 4×LP, 2×MC	22	—
Collector's Edition Box	Released: 1990; Label: Virgin; Formats: 2×CD	—	—
Elements Box	Released: November 1993; Label: Virgin; Formats: 4×CD	—	—
The Complete Tubular Bells	Released: November 1993; Label: WEA; Formats: 3×CD+DVD	167	13
Classic Album Selection – Six Albums 1973–1980	Released: 30 July 2012; Label: Mercury/Universal Music; Formats: 6×CD	—	68
The Studio Albums 1992–2003	Released: 21 October 2014; Label: Warner Music; Formats: 8×CD	—	—
Original Album Series	Released: 11 November 2016; Label: Rhino/Warner Music; Formats: 5×CD	—	—
"—" denotes releases that did not chart or were not released in that territory.

== Video albums ==
Title	Album details	Peak chart positions	Certifications
Title	Album details	UK	Certifications
The Essential Mike Oldfield	Released: October 1981; Label: Virgin Video; Formats: VHS	—	
Tubular Bells – Live in Concert	Released: 1984; Label: WOT Video/Festival; Formats: VHS; Australia-only release	—	
The Wind Chimes	Released: June 1988; Label: Virgin Music Video; Formats: VHS, CD-V	8	
Tubular Bells II – The Performance Live at Edinburgh Castle	Released: October 1992; Label: Warner Music Vision; Formats: VHS, LD	4	
Elements – The Best of Mike Oldfield	Released: September 1993; Label: Virgin; Formats: VHS, LD	5	
Tubular Bells III Live	Released: October 1998; Label: Warner Music Video; Formats: VHS	9	
Tubular Bells II & III Live	Released: 20 September 1999; Label: Warner Music Video; Formats: DVD	16	BPI: Gold
The Art in Heaven Concert	Released: 10 February 2000; Label: Warner Music Video; Formats: DVD, VHS	20	
Exposed	Released: 24 October 2005; Label: EMI/Virgin; Formats: 2×DVD	33	
Live at Montreux 1981	Released: 15 May 2006; Label: Eagle Vision; Formats: DVD	40	
The Tubular Bells 50th Anniversary Tour	Released: 7 November 2022; Label: Kaleidoscope Home Entertainment; Formats: 2×DVD, 2×Blu-ray	1	
"—" denotes releases that did not chart or were not released in that territory.

== EPs ==
Title	Album details	Peak chart positions
Title	Album details	UK
Take Four	Released: 1 December 1978; Label: Virgin; Formats: 7", 12"	72
The Singles	Released: 1981; Label: Virgin; Formats: 12"; Japan-only release	—
The Mike Oldfield EP	Released: September 1982; Label: Virgin; Formats: 7", 12"; Germany-only release	—
Tattoo – Live at Edinburgh Castle EP	Released: 7 December 1992; Label: WEA; Formats: CD	—
In Dulci Jubilo – The Mike Oldfield Christmas EP	Released: November 1993; Label: Virgin; Formats: CD, MC	—
The X-Files Theme EP	Released: 16 December 1998; Label: EastWest Japan; Formats: CD; Japan-only release	—
"—" denotes releases that did not chart or were not released in that territory.

== Collaborations ==
Year	Title	Artist	Notes
1968	Children of the Sun	The Sallyangie	As part of a duo with his sister Sally Oldfield. Sallyangie also released two singles.
1969	"Two Ships" / "Colours of the World"	The Sallyangie	Single
1969	"Child of Allah" / "Lady Go Lightly"	The Sallyangie	Single
1970	Shooting at the Moon	Kevin Ayers and the Whole World	Bass guitar, lead guitar and backing vocals
1970	"If You've Got Money" / "Yep"	Bridget St. John	Elektra single; Bridget St. John featuring Kevin Ayers and the Whole World, including Mike Oldfield on lead guitar
1971	Edgar Broughton Band	The Edgar Broughton Band	Mandolin on one track
1971	Ear of Beholder	Lol Coxhill	
1971	Whatevershebringswesing	Kevin Ayers and the Whole World	Bass guitar and lead guitar
1972	Nurses Song with Elephants	David Bedford	
1973	Legend	Henry Cow	
1974	Rock Bottom	Robert Wyatt	Lead guitar on one track
1974	The Confessions of Dr. Dream and Other Stories	Kevin Ayers	Lead guitar on one track
1974	June 1, 1974	Kevin Ayers, John Cale, Nico and Brian Eno	Live album recorded at the Rainbow Theatre in London on 1 June 1974.
1974	Star's End	David Bedford	
1974	Unrest	Henry Cow	
1974	Theatre Royal Drury Lane 8th September 1974	Robert Wyatt	Live album released in 2005; lead guitar.
1975	The Rime of the Ancient Mariner	David Bedford	
1976	Odd Ditties	Kevin Ayers	A compilation of singles and unreleased tracks.
1976	The Odyssey	David Bedford	
1976	Bandages	The Edgar Broughton Band	
1977	Instructions for Angels	David Bedford	
1977	Mathematicians Air Display	Pekka Pohjola	Also known as a collaboration with Pekka Pohjola or The Consequences of Indecisions album. The original title is Keesojen lehto, under which it is available on CD from Love Records. There was also a release with a Swedish title.
1977	Song of the White Horse	David Bedford	
1977	Fine Old Tom	Tom Newman	
1978	Water Bearer	Sally Oldfield	Mandolin on "Child of Allah"; a song that Oldfield had previously recorded with his sister, Sally, as Sallyangie.
1979	Faerie Symphony	Tom Newman	
1979	Downwind	Pierre Moerlen's Gong	
1979	Strange Man, Changed Man	Bram Tchaikovsky	
1979	"Judy's Gone Down/Jung Lovers"	James Vane	Single
1980	Live	Pierre Moerlen's Gong	Live album
1980	The Concertina Record	Lea Nicholson	Guitar, sleigh bells and bodhrán on one track
1980	Joy	The Skids	
1983	Star Clusters, Nebulae & Places in Devon/The Song of the White Horse	David Bedford	Produced and Engineered by Oldfield. Also the only LP issued by Oldfield Music.
1990	Natasha	Sally Nathasha Oldfield	
1990	Kâma-Sûtra	Michel Polnareff	
1992	Still Life with Guitar	Kevin Ayers	
1992	BBC Radio 1: Live in Concert	Kevin Ayers	
1992	Pavarotti & Friends	Luciano Pavarotti	
1995	Variations on a Rhythm of Mike Oldfield	David Bedford	
1996	Singing the Bruise	Kevin Ayers	
1997	Snow Blind	Tom Newman	
1998	The Garden of Love	Kevin Ayers	
2000	Official Bootleg One	Phil Beer	
2000	Do Ya Wanna Play, Carl	Carl Palmer	
2002	From the Banks of the River Irwell	Max Bacon	
2005	Tag und Nacht	Schiller	
2006	Night of the Proms 2006	Night of the Proms	Various artists live concert album; orchestral sections of Tubular Bells and Ommadawn, and "Shadow on the Wall" with John Miles. Tubular Bells on DVD "Best of the Night of the Proms Vol.2". Moonlight Shadow with Miriam Stockley on DVD "Best of Night of the Proms Vol 3".
2008	"Song for Survival" featuring the Anuta tribe	Songs for Survival	Various artists charity album for Survival International. In support of the BBC television series Tribe and Amazon.
2012	Journey into Space	Terry Oldfield	Guitar on "Origin", "Flight of the Eagle" and "Dancer in the Void".
2012	Isles of Wonder: Music for the Opening Ceremony of the London 2012 Olympic Games	Various	Soundtrack from the 2012 Summer Olympics opening ceremony. Features new arrangements of Tubular Bells introduction, "Far Above the Clouds" and "In Dulci Jubilo". This album charted in the top ten around the world. Live performance also released on BBC DVD/Blu-ray.
2012	Islanders	York	"Islanders"
