= Pictures in the Dark =

Single by Mike Oldfield
- Released: 25 November 1985
- Recorded: 1985
- Genre: Pop/Rock
- Length: 5:54
- Label: Virgin Records
- Songwriter: Mike Oldfield
- Producer: Mike Oldfield

Mike Oldfield singles chronology
"Étude" (1984)	"Pictures in the Dark" (1985)	"Shine" (1986)

"Pictures in the Dark" is a song by Mike Oldfield released as a single mainly in Europe in 1985 (see 1985 in music). Singers on this single includes his girlfriend at the time, Anita Hegerland, Barry Palmer and well-known Welsh choirboy Aled Jones.

Since the song was not connected to an album it was rare until it was released on compilation albums such as Collection in 2002 and The Platinum Collection in 2006.

A music video was released for this single and Anita Hegerland and Aled Jones both appear in the video, but Barry Palmer does not; his vocals are mimed by Oldfield. The video includes many computer graphics. The video was available on The Wind Chimes (VHS and Laserdisc) and is also on the DVD version of Elements – The Best of Mike Oldfield.

== Track listing ==
=== 7-inch vinyl ===
1. "Pictures in the Dark" (4:18)
2. "Legend" (2:24)

=== 12-inch vinyl ===
1. "Pictures in the Dark" (Extended Version) (5:54)
2. "Legend" (2:24)
3. "The Trap" (2:37)

== Charts ==
Chart (1985)	Peak position
Austrian Singles Chart	3
German Singles Chart	4
Swiss Singles Chart	5
UK Singles Chart	50
