= Don Alfonso =

Single by Mike Oldfield (with David Bedford)
- B-side: "In Dulci Jubilo (For Maureen)"
- Released: 14 February 1975
- Recorded: October 1974
- Studio: The Manor
- Genre: Novelty song
- Length: 4:20 (Full length version 5:58)
- Label: Virgin
- Songwriter: Ted Waite
- Producer: Mike Oldfield

Mike Oldfield singles chronology
"Mike Oldfield's Single" (1974)	"Don Alfonso" (1975)	"In Dulci Jubilo" (1975)

"Don Alfonso" is the second UK single by musician Mike Oldfield, released in 1975. Side 1 has an additional credit: "featuring David Bedford on vocals". This is a comic novelty song from the 20th century, sung by a boasting, bogus toreador, who seems to know very little about bullfighting.

== Track listing ==
- "Don Alfonso" (traditional, arr. Oldfield) – 4:20
- "In Dulci Jubilo (For Maureen)" (J. S. Bach / M. Oldfield) – 2:51

== Recording details ==
This was the second time David Bedford sang on a recording of this song. He previously recorded it with Lol Coxhill as the Coxhill-Bedford Duo, who issued several singles under this name, and 3 songs on Coxhill's 1971 album Ear of Beholder, where this song appeared. All songs made under this name are revivals of early 20th century repertoire from British music hall, American Vaudeville, and minstrel shows, and feature Bedford on piano and vocals, and Coxhill on vocals. On the Coxhill album, the composer is credited as Ted Waite, a British music hall comedian, but the authorship may be in dispute, as all releases of Oldfield's version, including a recent DVD containing the video, credit it as "traditional".

The Mike Oldfield version features David Bedford on lead and harmony vocals, piano and accordion, Mike Oldfield on rhythm guitar, bass guitar and multi-tracked lead guitar, Chris Cutler on drums, and Kevin Ayers on wine bottles. It was recorded in October 1974 at the Manor.

Side 2 is Oldfield's first version of "In Dulci Jubilo", a traditional German Christmas carol, dedicated to his mother Maureen (hence the subtitle "For Maureen") who died two months after recording the track, in January 1975. "In Dulci Jubilo (For Maureen)" is not the better-known version which was later released as his next single. Though no names are credited on this release, it is likely that Les Penning played woodwinds on this release, and Mike Oldfield plays all the other instruments. The track was recorded in November 1974 at the Beacon, his home studio. Oldfield's versions have been issued with more than one composer credit; the authorship shown in the track listing above is how it appears on a recent compilation CD (containing the remake). Most editions from the 1970s and 1980s credit it to R. L. Pearsall, arr. Oldfield. Bach and Pearsall both wrote arrangements of it, but the song dates further back than either composer. Italian pressings of a single from 1975 (not the version from this record, but the re-recording) credit it to J. S. Bach.

== Release history ==
This single was released at the height of Oldfield's popularity, in the UK, France, Germany, Italy and Australia; yet it remains one of his most obscure records. It appears to have been withdrawn shortly after issue, and never charted anywhere. Virgin Records usually allowed its offices in other countries to maintain their own issue program, and keep records in print as long as they wished, but in this case the British parent company may have ordered it to be withdrawn worldwide before most Oldfield fans were aware it existed, as there has never been a re-issue in any country, despite a demand from collectors. Any edition (in decent condition) can easily fetch at least £100 on the collectors' market.

French, German and Italian issues each came with a different picture cover (2 different covers in Germany, one marked "English version" for reasons explained below). There is no cover for British and Australian editions.

In early 1975, a longer version of this song with timing of 5:58 appeared on a Virgin Records compilation double LP album titled V. It was also featured on the rare Greek-only CD compilation Progressive Rock, issued 1997 (Virgin 7243 84277 420).

It seems likely the song had appeared on no compilations until 2006, when the song appeared on The Platinum Collection.

The version of "In Dulci Jubilo" which appears on this record was even scarcer; it had never been re-issued until 2010 when in June the album Hergest Ridge was re-released in the deluxe edition series. This rare "Dulci Jubilo (for Maureen)" appeared as bonus track, making its CD debut some 36 years after its first vinyl release. The subtitle, "(for Maureen)", which was only used for this specific version of the track, refers to Oldfield's late mother Maureen.

== German version ==
In Germany, two versions of the single were issued: the normal version, and an alternate version marked "Deutsche version, Gesangssolist Paul" (German version, lead vocals by Paul) on the cover, which shows a photo of a man wearing a matador's hat. The identity of "Paul" has never been revealed. While some claim that in this version the German language vocal does not replace the original, but is sung over top of the English version (so, the claim goes, the track was obviously not made with access to the original multi-track session tapes, which raises the question as to whether Oldfield or Virgin Records UK approved it). However, from the sound of the single, it seems more likely that the German vocal only replaced the original David Bedford performance, while the (uncredited) backing vocals stayed in English, which can be heard clearly underneath. This version was probably made using the final mix, where the main vocal was on a separate track (not used in the German version) while the backing track contained all the instruments together with the (uncredited) backing vocals which therefore couldn't be replaced. Additionally, the German language version was shortened by 20 seconds, running for 4:00 instead of 4:20 as the English single.

This version was produced by Edgar Froese of Tangerine Dream, as credited on the label. To this day, nothing is known for certain about who "Paul" was, who produced it, whether Virgin Records UK knew of or approved its recording, and if not, how Virgin Records Germany got away with releasing it.

According to the official homepage of the band Agitation Free, the vocalist was Roland "Rolli" Paulick. Paulick was a roadie of Tangerine Dream and synth player in the line-up of Tangerine Dream for their second LP Alpha Centauri. At the time of the recording of Don Alfonso, Edgar Froese was producer and friend of Tangerine Dream and Paulick.

== Music video ==
The released film for Don Alfonso features the well known British comedy actor, Larry Martyn, as Don Alfonso.

There is no evidence that Virgin Records made any effort to promote this record, but they must have intended to initially, as they financed not one, but two promotional videos for the song. Neither video was shown in the 1970s (or 80s or 90s), and one of them has still not been shown publicly to this day. Nothing is known about its content or style.

The other video (actually shot on film) was finally shown for the first time when it was issued on the DVD, Elements – The Best of Mike Oldfield in 2004. This is the only promo video on the DVD with its soundtrack in mono (although the single is in stereo); all other songs have a remastered stereo or surround soundtrack.

The live-action video illustrates the lyrics with slapstick comedy, sight gags, and the actor's pained reactions toward the camera after every gag, in the style of comedian Benny Hill, who had been approached to appear in it. Hill refused because he writes most of his own material, and did not want to appear in a film scripted by someone imitating his style. An unidentified actress also appears in the film. No musicians, real or acting, appear in it.

=== Synopsis ===
The action takes place in a small Spanish town, shot on the pre-existing "Spanish village" set on the backlot of Pinewood Studios in Buckinghamshire. Don Alfonso rides into town on a horse, and strikes a dignified pose for unseen onlookers. Then he falls off the saddle.

Upon recovering, he finds his sword has become bent and throws the sword away. But the bend causes it to fly like a boomerang, returning to hit him in the head. In the next scene, Alfonso has recovered, and his sword is repaired. To accompany the line, "I've fought bulls in the sunshine and I've fought bulls in the rain", Alfonso puts on dark glasses, and the sky abruptly rains on him.

While Alfonso demonstrates his fancy swordplay, a woman walks by in the background. The sword manages to catch her red dress, and completely removes it. This happens off camera; all we see is the dress flying through the air, and landing in Alfonso's arms. He tries to call the woman back, but gets no response. Embarrassed, he rolls the dress into a ball, as if to hide it, and slinks off in the other direction.

Next he encounters the "sweet senora" (probably the same actress) at a table in an outdoor restaurant. After stumbling up the curb, he introduces himself. During the lyric, "My heart went jingle jingle", Alfonso's chest pulses visibly under his vest. He asks the woman to dance, and she stands up. Alfonso is shocked to find she is a foot taller than he is. He shrugs, and proceeds to dance.

In the next scene, they are still dancing, but Alfonso now appears slightly taller than the woman because she is holding him up off the ground.

During the dance, the line "I've fought bulls in the rain" appears again, along with the rainstorm, which is so localised that Alfonso gets wet, but the woman he dances with does not.

After the dance, Alfonso gives the woman a kiss. Then he discovers his moustache has disappeared. He finds it on the woman's face.

Throughout this song, there is a recurring line, "Some call me Pedro, but that is not so, I'm Don Alfonso". Alfonso walks by a wall which has graffiti that reads, "Good old Pedro". Incensed that the name is wrong, he obtains paint and a brush, and changes it to read, "Good old Don Alfonso". Happy with his accomplishment, he walks away, and carelessly throws the paint behind him, splashing it against the wall.

The lyric that says "I've fought bulls in the rain" appears once more, and this time Alfonso gets a full bucket of water, followed by the bucket itself.

Now he is ready to perform in a bullfight. He approaches the arena from down a set of stone steps, but stumbles and slides down the last few steps. He enters the ring, and we see the fight from the bull's point of view, framed by its horns. Alfonso runs away as the bull charges, and its horns meet up with his backside. The camera cuts back to the exterior of the arena, and we see Alfonso flying over the wall. (Upon its landing, an all-too-obvious stop-action camera trick is used to replace the dummy with the live actor. This gag is copied directly from a Benny Hill sketch.)

Alfonso gets up and, throwing his cape to the ground as if to quit his profession, retrieves his horse, and leaves town.
