= Magic Touch (Mike Oldfield song) =

Single by Mike Oldfield

from the album Islands
- Released: November 1987
- Recorded: circa. 1987
- Genre: Pop rock
- Length: 4:04
- Label: Virgin
- Songwriter: Mike Oldfield
- Producers: Mike Oldfield; Geoffrey Downes

Mike Oldfield singles chronology
"The Time Has Come" (1987)	"Magic Touch" (1987)	"Flying Start" (1988)

United States release cover

"Magic Touch" is a song by musician Mike Oldfield, released as a single from his 1987 studio album Islands. The song charted on the US Billboard Album Rock Tracks chart, where it peaked at No. 10 for four consecutive weeks.

== Background ==
The original mix features Max Bacon on lead vocals and John Payne on backing vocals. The version with Max Bacon does not appear on the European releases of the Islands album, due to Bacon still being under contract to Arista Records at the time. However, Bacon's vocals do appear on the US album version, which was not released until 1988 in an attempt to capitalize on Bacon's familiarity to US audiences as the vocalist of GTR. The UK album version features Jim Price on vocals.

In the United States, "Magic Touch was released in January 1988 as the first single from Islands. Radio & Records reported in its 29 January 1988 publication that 73% of album oriented rock radio stations had added the song to their playlists. By February, the song had been added to over 150 album oriented rock playlists across the United States. The associate director of album promotion for Virgin Records told Billboard magazine that they planned to promote the song on Top 40 radio stations beginning on 15 February 1988.

The music video for "Magic Touch" was directed by Alex Proyas and features footage of European chateaus and rolling waves. The video for the song was also included on The Wind Chimes and Elements.

== Artwork ==
The single's artwork differed in Europe and North America. The European artwork showed Oldfield standing in front of a blue background, on which shadows of hands are present. The North American artwork is in a similar style to the album cover, showing hands rising out of the ocean.

== Track listing ==
1. "Magic Touch" (Original mix edit) – 4:04
2. "Music for the Video Wall" – 4:34
3. "Magic Touch" (Original mix) – 4:13

== Chart performance ==
Chart (1988)	Position
Album Rock Tracks	10
