= Anita Hegerland =

Norwegian singer

- Born: 3 March 1961 (age 65); Sandefjord, Norway
- Genres: Pop, pop rock
- Occupation: Singer
- Years active: 1969–present
- Website: anitahegerland.de

Anita Hegerland (born 3 March 1961) is a Norwegian singer, most known for her childhood career in Scandinavia, Germany, Switzerland, Austria, Netherlands, Belgium, and Luxembourg, and subsequent vocal contributions to Mike Oldfield's work, among others.

She is Norway's biggest selling solo artist and one of Norway's best-selling female artists in history. In 1971, she was, along with Michael Jackson, one of the world's best-selling child singers. At the age of ten, she became Norway's first artist to sell over a million copies. She is one of the best-selling solo singers in Norway, with sales of more than seven million albums and singles. Her songs have been released on nearly 30 million albums worldwide, most of which are with Roy Black and Mike Oldfield.

She is also an actress and has appeared in Norwegian, German, Swiss, and Austrian films and television series. She has participated in Melodi Grand Prix in 1971 ("Gi meg en zebra"), 1972 ("Happy Hippie"), 1983 ("Nå er jeg alene"), and in 2009 ("Party"). She came in as number four in 1971 and number three in 1972.

Hegerland had the biggest hit in Germany of any Norwegian artist ever with Schön ist es auf der Welt zu sein, in front of Lene Nystrøm (Aqua), Marit Larsen, Madcon, and A-ha.

For more than 20 years she had the record in Sweden as the singer who was the longest on Svensktoppen, the main music charts.

== Biography ==
Hegerland was born in Sandefjord, and was discovered at the age of 8 by Fredrik Friis during a Christmas show where she was performing. Hegerland's musical career took off in 1970 with "Mitt sommarlov" (transl. "My Summer Vacation"), performed in Swedish in the Scandinavian countries. It spent 22 weeks on Norway's singles chart, with three weeks at #1, and the song was also a #1 hit in Sweden during fives weeks. In 1971 she released a single with German artist Roy Black; "Schön ist es auf der Welt zu sein" (transl. It's beautiful to be in the world) in German-speaking countries. The song was recorded both with German and Norwegian vocals. It sold over 2 million copies (of which more than 1.3 million came from Germany), and spent 30 weeks on the singles chart (top peak #3) in Norway.

In total, she had four different albums on the Norwegian chart as a child star. The last one was released in 1973 (when she was 12 years old). She participated in the Norwegian final (for entry to the Eurovision Song Contest 1971), but did not win. She continued as a pop singer in Germany and Scandinavia for several years and then pursued an adult vocal career.

She met British musician Mike Oldfield while performing on his non-album single "Pictures in the Dark" in 1985. She also performed the songs "The Time Has Come", "North Point" and "When The Night's On Fire" on Oldfield's 1987 album Islands, and two of his biggest hit songs: "Pictures In The Dark" and Innocent, from his 1989 album Earth Moving. She and Oldfield lived together from 1985 to 1991 and they have two children, Greta and Noah.

Until recently, she lived on Nesøya island near Oslo with her partner, Jock Loveband. In 1999, their daughter Kaja was born.

Hegerland released a new album called Starfish in 2011, a pop/rock album produced by Ronni Le Tekrø (TNT). This album was #1 for 39 weeks between November 2011 and November 2012, on Meteli.net, a Finnish downloading site.

== Awards and nominations ==
At nine years old in 1970 she became the youngest person to ever appear in the Swedish Svensktoppen. She has appeared on Billboard’s top ten in several countries, including Norway, Denmark, Sweden, and West Germany. She was awarded the Norwegian gold record award for "Mitt sommarlov" (1970), performed in Swedish, which reached top rankings on VG-lista in Norway, spent five weeks at number one on the Swedish best selling chart Kvällstoppen and was also number one at the Swedish Svensktoppen in Sweden. Another song, "Da er det skjønt å være til", appeared on VG-lista for 30 weeks in 1972.

The German newspaper Bildzeitung awarded her song "Schön ist es auf der Welt zu sein" to the Schlager of all time in Germany.

On 8 August 2015 she was inducted into the Rockabilly Hall of Fame.

== Discography ==
- 1970: Trollmannen Lurifiks Og Mange Andre
- 1970: Trylletrall
- 1980: Anita Hegerland
- 1983: All the Way
- 1985: Flørt
- 1994: Voices
- 2000: Anitas beste barnesanger
- 2011: Starfish

She also appears on a number of other albums, including a number of albums with Mike Oldfield such as Islands (1987), Earth Moving (1989) and Heaven's Open (1991). She is a vocalist on Oldfield's single "Pictures in the Dark", which reached 50th in the United Kingdom in 1985.

== Filmography ==
- 1971: Wenn mein Schätzchen auf die Pauke haut – Anita Kellermann
- 1971: Rudi, benimm dich – Anita
- 1971: Die Rudi Carrell Show (TV series) – Anita
- 1971-73: Die Drehscheibe (TV series) – Anita
- 1972: Kinderarzt Dr. Fröhlich (film music)
- 1973: Old Barge, Young Love – Anita
- 1974: Die goldenen Fünfziger
- 1980: 1958 (film music)
- 1985: Deilig er fjorden! – Pia Svahberg
- 1987: Turnaround – Buff
- 1988: Mike Oldfield: North Point – Anita
- 2001: Josefine i Gulrotparken
