= Mike Oldfield's Single =

Single by Mike Oldfield

from the album Tubular Bells
- A-side: "Mike Oldfield's Single (Theme from Mike Oldfield's album Tubular Bells)"
- B-side: "Froggy Went a-Courting"
- Released: February 1974 (US); 28 June 1974 (UK)
- Recorded: 1972 – 1974
- Genre: Folk, progressive rock
- Length: 4:36
- Label: Virgin Records
- Songwriter: Mike Oldfield
- Producers: Tom Newman, Mike Oldfield

Mike Oldfield singles chronology
"Mike Oldfield's Single" (1974)	"Don Alfonso" (1975)

Official audio
- "Mike Oldfield's Single" on YouTube

"Mike Oldfield's Single (Theme from Tubular Bells)" is the debut single by the English musician Mike Oldfield, released in 1974.

The A-side is a variation of one of the themes from Oldfield's 1973 debut album, Tubular Bells, and was made in response to an American single containing an excerpt from Tubular Bells which Oldfield did not authorise. After its use in the 1973 film The Exorcist, "Tubular Bells" (as featured on the American single) reached #7 on the U.S. Billboard Hot 100.

== US single ==
- "Tubular Bells" (now the original theme from The Exorcist) - (Oldfield) 3:18
- "Tubular Bells" - (Oldfield) 4:39

Virgin (dist. Atlantic) VR-55100 (VRS-55100 in Canada), issued in February 1974.

Side 1 of this single is an excerpt from side 1 of the Tubular Bells album, which contains 2 long pieces, "Tubular Bells" parts 1 and 2. The excerpt was made by staff at Atlantic Records, the American distributors of Oldfield's label, Virgin Records, and was made from bits and pieces of the first 8 minutes of the album, often resulting in abrupt transitions that did not occur in the original version. The abruptness of the edits is a combination of the choice of excerpts, and physical tape splice editing. This version also suffers from a loud hum, which is clearly audible in the quiet opening section, and is not heard on the album. It ends with a return to the opening, which fades out. On the album, there is no return to the opening. This edited version is often referred to as "Now the Original" in reference to the advertising sub-title, which is printed on the label in larger type than the song title itself. This phrase also appeared on stickers attached to the album's shrink wrap in the US.

Side 2 is an edited excerpt from the end section of the album's side 1, where Vivian Stanshall announces instruments as they appear; it fades out before the original version's conclusion.

Mike Oldfield was displeased when he learned this version had been made without his knowledge or input, and refused its release in the United Kingdom. A UK test pressing of this record exists, with catalogue number VS-101, the number that was eventually used for the single Mike made as a substitution, suggesting the "Now the Original" version was considered for release in the UK at one time.

This version of the single was also issued in Canada, France, New Zealand (first edition), South Africa (first edition), and Chile. In Canada, the single reached #3, and was #103 in the Top 200 Singles of 1974.

== US promo singles ==
=== "Tubular Bells" Excerpts E.P. ===
- Side 1
  - "A" - (Oldfield) 2:44
  - "B" - (Oldfield) 1:40
  - "C" - (Oldfield) 5:36
- Side 2
  - "A" - (Oldfield) 2:35
  - "B" - (Oldfield) 2:40
  - "C (Sailor's Hornpipe)" - (traditional) 1:30

Virgin (dist. Atlantic) PR-196, plays at 33 rpm

This 7 inch E.P. was issued inside promotional copies of the album, which bore a sticker explaining to disc jockeys that an additional record of excerpts recommended for radio play is enclosed. It was also issued separately from the album.

=== Second promo ===
- "Tubular Bells (Now the Original Theme from The Exorcist)" - (Oldfield) 3:18 (stereo)
- "Tubular Bells (Now the Original Theme from The Exorcist)" - (Oldfield) 3:18 (mono)

Virgin (dist. Atlantic) VR-55100 (same number as non-promo edition)

This version can be found with either a white (normal) or blue label, and some copies were issued in a cover that did not come with the version issued to the public.

=== Third promo ===
- "Tubular Bells (Long Version)" - (Oldfield) 7:40
- "Tubular Bells" - (Oldfield) 4:39

Virgin (dist. Atlantic) E.P.-PR-199, issued in 1974

Some time after the release of the "Now the Original" excerpt, Virgin/Atlantic tried promoting the section near the end of side 1 of the album. Since this section had been omitted from the previous promo single, a new promo record was necessary. Side 2 is the same edit that was previously released as the B-side of "Now the Original"; side 1 is a longer version of the same section. No playing speed is shown on the label, but given its length and catalogue prefix, side 1 (at least) likely plays at 331/3 rpm.

== UK single ==
- "Mike Oldfield's Single (Theme from Mike Oldfield's album 'Tubular Bells')" - (Oldfield) 4:36
- "Froggy Went A-Courting" - (traditional, arr. Oldfield) 4:30

Virgin VS-101, issued June 28, 1974

Mike Oldfield was already recording his next album, Hergest Ridge, when he produced this new piece to be released outside North America, in place of the American single. Instead of using either of the two popular excerpts from that single, Oldfield chose to re-arrange a section of "Tubular Bells part 2", the so-called "guitars sounding like bagpipes" section, now presented in a pastoral arrangement similar to much of Hergest Ridge, and featuring Lindsay Cooper on oboe, who had played a similar section on Hergest Ridge. Mike Oldfield likely plays all other instruments, which include multiple layers of acoustic, electric, and bass guitars, and harmonium.

Side 2 is the popular children's song, set to a new melody by Oldfield, and spoken rather than sung by Mike Oldfield and Vanessa Branson (sister of Virgin boss Richard Branson), who take turns reciting lines. Despite the way it's spelled on the label, Oldfield deliberately enunciates his opening line as "The frog went a-courting...", and nowhere does the word "uh-huh" appear, as it did frequently in the better known children's version. No list of musicians appears on the cover, but the song is believed to have been played by Mike Oldfield on vocals, guitars, mandolin, probably bass guitar, and possibly piano (or the latter may have been played by David Bedford), Vanessa Branson on vocals, Lol Coxhill on saxophone, and an unknown drummer. A number of places also cite the female vocalist as Bridget St John, instead of Branson. One year later, the entire backing track, minus the vocals, was re-used for "Paolino Maialino" ["Paulie Piggie"], a novelty single by Romina Power, about a child who had an aversion to cleaning himself.

A cover was included with some copies, and is unusual in that it is black and white on the front, and in colour on the back. Side 1's sub-title is shorted to "Theme from Tubular Bells" on the front. The cover was designed by Trevor Key, who designed the cover for Tubular Bells and many other Oldfield and Virgin albums. The back shows a colour photo of 2 frogs mating; a typical example of the Virgin label's naughty sense of humour at the time.

Just as Tubular Bells was Virgin's first album (or, to be precise, one of three albums released on the same day), "Mike Oldfield's Single" was Virgin's first UK single, but issued more than a year later. This demonstrates that Virgin was primarily an album label in its early years, with little interest in being a contender for the singles charts. Even so, the record charted at number 31 on the UK Singles Chart.

This version was also issued in Sweden, Portugal (second edition), Greece, and Yugoslavia. In some countries, the sub-title is translated into a local language.

A shorter version of this track (3:56) was remastered and remixed for the 2009 Mercury Records reissue of Tubular Bells. Furthermore, it was reissued by Virgin EMI for Record Store Day 2013.

=== Personnel ===
Side one

- Lindsay Cooper – oboe
- Mike Oldfield – all other instruments

Side two

- Vanessa Branson – vocals
- Lol Coxhill – soprano saxophone
- (unknown) – drums
- Mike Oldfield – vocal, all other instruments

== European singles ==
- "Tubular Bells" - (Oldfield) 3:18
- "Froggy Went A-Courting" - (traditional, arr. Oldfield) 4:27

Side 1 is the same as the American "Now the Original" version, but without that sub-title on the label.

This version was issued in Portugal, the Netherlands (one of two editions), New Zealand (second edition), and South Africa (second and third editions, with different covers).

- "Tubular Bells" - (Oldfield) 3:18
- "Froggy Went A-Courting" - (traditional, arr. Oldfield) 4:25

Side 2 is an alternate mix. On the UK mix, the verse with the lyric, "The owls did hoot and the birds did sing" is recited entirely by Vanessa Branson. On this version, the first part of the verse is recited by Mike Oldfield. This version fades out slightly earlier, although some labels quote the UK mix's timing.

This version was issued in Italy, and the Netherlands (one of two editions) where "Froggy" is identified as side 1.

- "Mike Oldfield's Single (Theme from Mike Oldfield's album 'Tubular Bells')" - (Oldfield) 4:33
- "Froggy Went A-Courting" - (traditional, arr. Oldfield) 4:25

This version, with the UK A-side and alternate B-side, was issued in Germany and Spain. In some countries, the sub-title is translated into a local language.

== Australian single ==
- "Tubular Bells" - (Oldfield) 4:00
- "Froggy Went A-Courting" - (traditional, arr. Oldfield) 4:10

Virgin K-5515, issued Apr, 1974

Another mix of the single was released in Australia, apart from the US, UK and European versions, at 4 minutes long, using a different blend of elements from the album's first side. It was distributed by Festival Records in Australia and peaked at No. 12 on the Australian Kent Music Report on 24 June 1974.

== Charts ==
=== Weekly charts ===
Chart (1974)	Peak position
Canada Top Singles (RPM)	3
UK Singles (OCC)	31
US Billboard Hot 100	7
Australia Kent Music Report	12
New Zealand RIANZ charts	4

=== Year-end charts ===
1974 year-end chart performance for "Mike Oldfield's Single"
Chart (1974)	Position
US Billboard Hot 100	79
