= Islands (Mike Oldfield song) =

Single by Mike Oldfield featuring Bonnie Tyler

from the album Islands
- Released: 7 September 1987
- Genre: Pop rock
- Length: 5:35 (album version); 4:20 (single version)
- Label: Virgin
- Songwriter(s): Mike Oldfield
- Producer(s): Mike Oldfield; Tom Newman; Alan Shacklock

Mike Oldfield singles chronology
"In High Places" (1987)	"Islands" (1987)	"The Time Has Come" (1987)

"Islands" is a song by English musician Mike Oldfield, featuring Welsh singer Bonnie Tyler on vocals. It features on Oldfield's 1987 album of the same name. It was written by Oldfield, who co-produced the track with Tom Newman and Alan Shacklock. The track was released as a single in September 1987 by Virgin Records.

== Writing and recording ==
English musician Mike Oldfield described "Islands" as "the high spot" of its parent album. In early 1987, he left his partner and children, and had moved to Megève in France. Oldfield wrote "Islands" during that time, while feeling "lonely, isolated and cut off". After struggling with the vocals, he invited Welsh singer Bonnie Tyler to record it, describing her performance as "spine-tingling, exactly the way it was supposed to be".

== Critical reception ==
In a retrospective review for AllMusic, Mike DeGagne opined that Tyler's vocal "lifts the title track higher than any other cut [on the album]".

== Formats and track listings ==
- UK 7-inch single
1. "Islands" (featuring Bonnie Tyler) – 4:18
2. "The Wind Chimes" (Part One) – 2:24
- UK 12-inch single
1. "Islands" (featuring Bonnie Tyler) – 5:35
2. "When the Nights on Fire" (featuring Anita Hegerland) – 6:42
3. "The Wind Chimes" (Part One) – 2:24

== Charts ==
Chart (1987)	Peak position
Spain (AFYVE)	22
Switzerland (Schweizer Hitparade)	22
UK Singles (OCC)	100
West Germany (GfK Entertainment Charts)	41

== Credits and personnel ==
Credits adapted from the liner notes of the Islands album.

Recording

- Mastered by Greg Fulginiti at Artisan Sound Recorders

Management

- Published by Oldfield Music Ltd. and Virgin Music (Publishers) Ltd.
- Bonnie Tyler appears courtesy of CBS Records

Personnel

- Mike Oldfield – bass, engineering, guitars, percussion, producer, songwriter, technician, vocals
- Bonnie Tyler – lead vocals
- Micky Moody – electric guitars
- Rick Fenn – acoustic guitar, electric guitar
- Phil Spalding – bass
- Mickey Simmonds – keyboards
- Raphael Ravenscroft – saxophone
- Andy Mackay – saxophone, oboe
- Pierre Moerlen – drums, vibraphone
- Tony Beard – drums
- Benoit Moerlen – vibraphone, percussion
- Tom Newman – production
- Alan Shacklock – production
- Richard Barrie – assistant engineer, assistant technician
- Serban Ghenea – mixing
- Tom Coyne – mastering
