= The Sailor's Hornpipe =

Traditional hornpipe melody

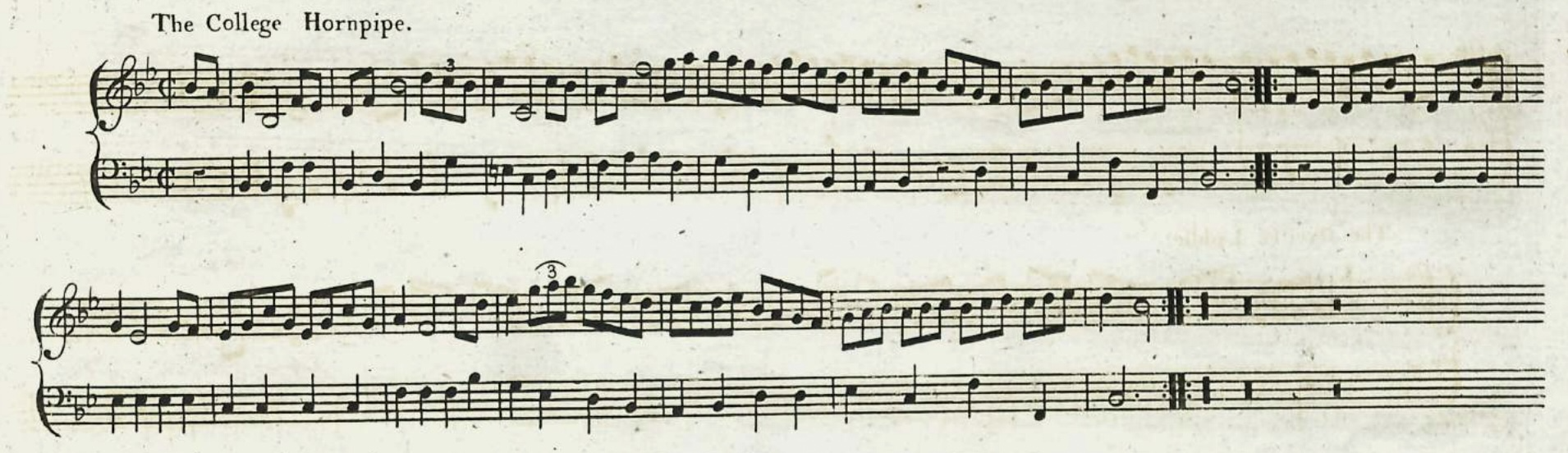
"The College Hornpipe", Alexander McGlashan's Collection of Scots Measures (1781).

The Sailor's Hornpipe (also known as The College Hornpipe and Jack's the Lad) is a traditional hornpipe melody. It has a strong association with the Royal Navy and Popeye.

== Music ==
The melody is divided into two sections, each with eight measures. It is commonly notated in B-flat major.

The anacrusis is most commonly played as an eighth note pivot from the tonic to the leading tone which resolves back to the tonic on the downbeat. Occasionally, this pickup is rendered as a descent from the mediant. The tonic note on the downbeat of the first full bar is immediately followed by a downward octave leap to the second beat. Most often, the lower tonic note is repeated on beat three, creating a "pom, pom" effect.

A turning figure, beginning on the dominant, at the end of the first bar continues through the downbeat of the second. The melody returns to the original octave on the second beat of the second bar, where the "pom, pom" figure is repeated. Taken together, this is the aural signature of the tune, recognizable the world over as the Popeye motif.

The opening motif is immediately sequenced up a step. This repetition is almost always harmonized as a secondary dominant leading to the melody's arrival at the dominant in the fourth measure. From there, it explodes into melodic runs typical of dance tunes.

The second half of the melody continues the running figures and the melodic sequences of the first half. In some versions, the melody remains diatonic throughout. It is more common for the fourth scale degree to be raised in the third bar of the second strain, echoing the first strain's progression. The compass of the tune is a full two octaves.

== History ==
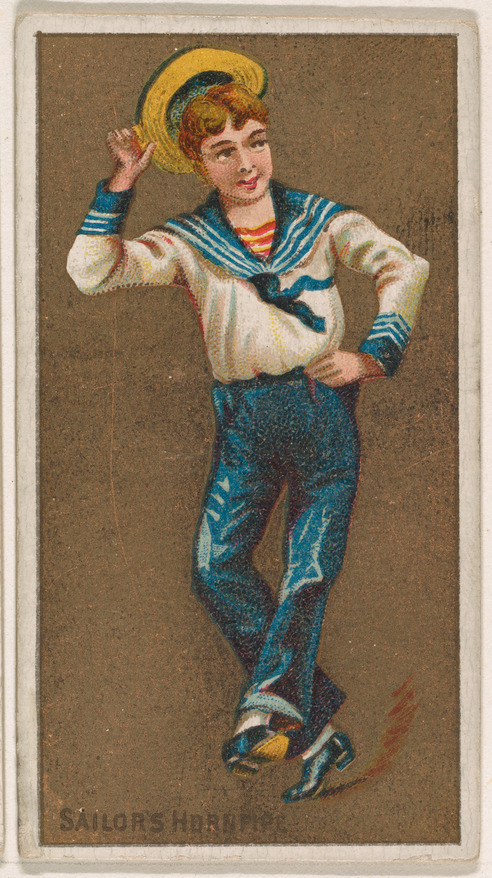
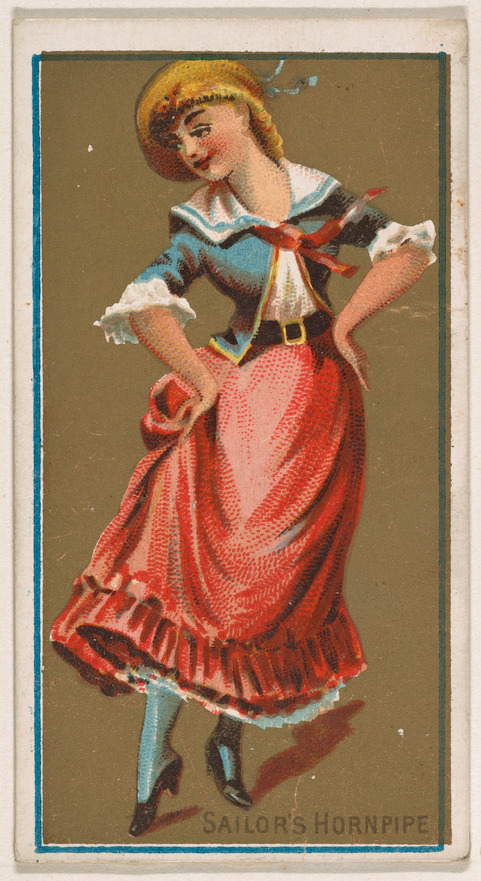
Cigarette cards of the Kinney Brothers Tobacco Company (1889) depicting the Sailor's Hornpipe dance

A hornpipe is an instrument. The term also applies to dances. There is no clear evidence that proves the dance was named after the instrument.

Hornpipes were originally in triple meters, but by the 18th century, they were increasingly composed in common time. They were often danced in theaters as interstitial entertainment between acts of larger works. Many hornpipes were named after their dancers: Fishar's Hornpipe, Aldridge's Hornpipe, Richar's Hornpipe, Miss Baker's Hornpipe, West's Hornpipe, Durang's Hornpipe, etc.

A particular style of hornpipe emerged where the dancer was dressed as a sailor. A typical example would be the hornpipe performed as the character Jacky Tar by a dancer named Yates at Drury Lane in 1740. "Jack Tar" was a nickname for sailors. "Jack Tar" hornpipes became their own particular subgenre. The melodies had a peculiar, invigorating emphasis on the second and third beats in certain bars.

=== Name ===
As the "sailor's hornpipe" genre proliferated, the name could be applied to any number of dances and tunes. The Royal Navy embraced the tradition of hornpipe dances, sometimes using them as exercise routines aboard their ships.

By the 19th century, "The Sailor's hornpipe" was synonymous with one particular melody, borrowed from a traditional song called "Jack's the Lad".

"The College Hornpipe" is the most common alternate name for the tune. In the 1750s, Charles & Samuel Thompson began publishing hornpipe collections. In one of the collections from roughly 1757, Number 18 is titled "The College" and contains the first printed version of the tune by that name. "The College Hornpipe" appears again in the William Vickers manuscript of 1770. The same tune has also been called the "Collage Hornpipe".

James Goodman catalogued the tune in 1861 as "McNeile's Hornpipe".

== Appearances ==
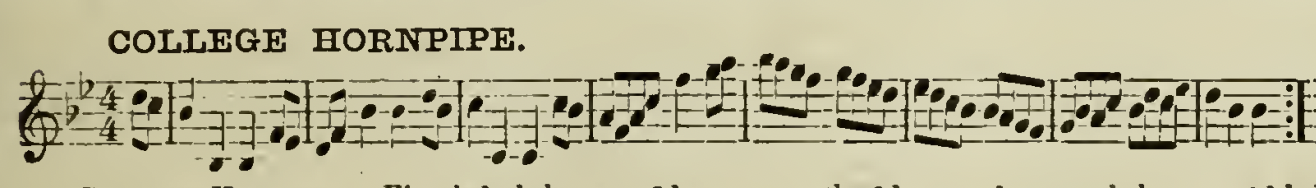
"College Hornpipe" from The Musician's Omnibus No. 1.

By 1798, a London publisher named Joseph Dale arranged "The Sailor's Hornpipe" as a rondo for piano. Arthur Sullivan refers to the melody throughout H.M.S. Pinafore (1878).

The tune was heavily anthologized in works like Elias Howe's The Musician's Omnibus (1863) and William Bradbury Ryan's Mammoth Collection (1883). Charles Ives quotes "The Sailor's Hornpipe" in several of his compositions. John Philip Sousa incorporates the tune into his "Jack Tar March" (1903).

In 1905, Sir Henry Wood composed Fantasia on British Sea Songs which incorporates the melody. During Wood's tenure at the BBC Proms in London, his Fantasia became a regular feature on the final concert. A tradition evolved at the Last Night of the Proms that when the "Hornpipe" is heard the audience audibly responds. Spectators now bring miniature foghorns and party horns and blow them along to the music, creating a loud, frenetic finale as the music reaches its fastest speed.

William Walton deploys the tune as a counterpoint to "Rule, Britannia!" in the "Hornpipe" from Façade, his 1921 setting of Edith Sitwell's poem series.

"The Sailor's Hornpipe" became an instant identifier for Popeye due to its use as a theme song in Max Fleischer's animated films. Beginning in 1933, the films were produced for 24 years, making them the longest-running cartoon series in cinema. In the opening credits, the hornpipe is usually the first thing a viewer hears before the main theme song "I'm Popeye the Sailor Man".

== Recordings ==
College Hornpipe
The Sailor's Hornpipe

"The Sailor's Hornpipe" has been recorded several times:

- Jasper Bisbee, "College Hornpipe" (Edison Records, 1923).
- John Baltzell, "The Sailor's Hornpipe" (Banner Records, 1927).
- The Tornados, "Popeye Twist" (Decca, 1962)
- The Spotnicks, "Bach Goes to Sea" (Oriole, 1963)
- Mike Oldfield, Tubular Bells (Virgin Records, 1973); Tubular Bells 2003 (Warner Music Group, 2003)
- Achim Reichel, as "Piratentanz" on Klabautermann (Nova, 1977)
- Yo-Yo Ma, Edgar Meyer, and Mark O'Connor, Appalachia Waltz (Sony Classical Records, 1996)
- Ashley MacIsaac, as “B Flat Clogs And Reels” on Live At The Savoy (Linus Entertainment, 2004)
- Carlos Núñez, Cinema Do Mar (Saint George/Sony BMG 2005)
