= In Dulci Jubilo / On Horseback =

1975 single by Mike Oldfield

"In Dulci Jubilo"
- Netherlands single cover (The UK version has no unique cover)

Single by Mike Oldfield
- A-side: "On Horseback" (double A-side)
- Released: 14 November 1975
- Recorded: November 1974–October 1975
- Genre: Progressive folk
- Length: 2:51
- Label: Virgin Records
- Songwriters: Traditional, arr. by Mike Oldfield
- Producer: Mike Oldfield

Mike Oldfield singles chronology
"Don Alfonso" (1975)	"In Dulci Jubilo" (1975)	"Portsmouth" (1976)

Official video
- "In Dulci Jubilo" on YouTube

French single cover

"In Dulci Jubilo Christmas EP"

Single by Mike Oldfield

from the album Elements - The Best of Mike Oldfield
- Released: 19 November 1993
- Genre: Folk
- Label: Virgin Records
- Producer: Mike Oldfield

Mike Oldfield singles chronology
"Moonlight Shadow (Reissue)" (1993)	"In Dulci Jubilo Christmas EP" (1993)	"Hibernaculum" (1994)

"In Dulci Jubilo"/"On Horseback" is a double A-side single and third overall by English musician Mike Oldfield, released in November 1975 by Virgin Records. It features an instrumental version of the German traditional Christmas carol "In dulci jubilo" and Oldfield's second version of the song following an earlier recording released as the B-side to his previous single, "Don Alfonso". The song "On Horseback" is the final and previously untitled section to "Ommadawn (Part Two)" from his third studio album Ommadawn, released just one month before. The single is certified silver by the British Phonographic Industry for selling 200,000 copies in the UK.

== Songs ==
=== "In Dulci Jubilo" ===
This is an instrumental version of the German traditional Christmas carol of the same name, known best in Britain as "Good Christian Men Rejoice". Oldfield had recorded an earlier version with Les Penning as the B-side to his previous single, "Don Alfonso", which did not chart. Oldfield felt a better version could be done, so he re-recorded it in October 1975 at The Manor Studio while keeping some of the backing tracks from the first version that were put down at his home studio in The Beacon, in November 1974. This version features Penning on two recorders and kortholt, William Murray on snare drum, and Oldfield on acoustic and electric guitars, bass, piano, and ARP string synthesiser. Most pressings from the 1970s and 1980s credit the song to R. L. Pearsall, with arrangements by Oldfield. Although Bach and Pearsall both wrote arrangements, the tune dates further back than either composer. Italian pressings of the single from 1975 credit it to J. S. Bach.

The song received radio airplay across Europe during the Christmas season. It reached number 3 in the Netherlands, number 4 in the UK, and number 7 in Ireland.

=== "On Horseback" ===
"On Horseback" features Oldfield on vocals accompanied by a children's chorus, credited as the Penrhos Kids. It previously appeared as the untitled song at the end of "Ommadawn (Part Two)" from Oldfield's third studio album Ommadawn, released just one month before. The album's liner notes refer to it as "the horse song on side two". Virgin Records recognised the song as a potential Christmas hit, and it was played on radio before it was issued as a single which prompted the label to release the single as a double A-side.

On 27 July 2012 at the 2012 Summer Olympics opening ceremony Oldfield performed renditions of Tubular Bells, "Far Above the Clouds" and "In Dulci Jubilo" during a segment about the NHS. This rendition appears on the soundtrack album Isles of Wonder.

The piece was also used as the theme tune to the BBC cookery show Fanny Cradock Cooks for Christmas.

== Music video ==
A music video was made for this song, and is featured on the DVD Elements – The Best of Mike Oldfield. The video splits the screen up to 9 thumbnail frames, each showing Oldfield or Les Penning playing a different instrument. The music video was directed by Bruce Gowers.

== Charts ==
Chart (1975)	Peak position
Belgium (Ultratop 50 Flanders)	4
Irish Singles Chart	7
Netherlands (Dutch Top 40)	3
Netherlands (Single Top 100)	2
UK Singles (Official Charts)	4

== Certifications ==
Region	Certification	Certified units/sales
United Kingdom (BPI)	Silver	200,000^{‡}
^{‡} Sales+streaming figures based on certification alone.

== Track listing ==
=== UK seven-inch single ===
- "In Dulci Jubilo" (J. S. Bach / M. Oldfield) – 2:49
- "On Horseback" (music: M. Oldfield; lyrics: M. Oldfield / W. Murray) – 3:25

Virgin VS-131

The UK edition has "In Dulci Jubilo" marked as side "A". It was also issued in other European countries, excluding France.

=== UK twelve-inch promo single ===
- "An Excerpt From Ommadawn - Part I" (M. Oldfield) – 7:18
- "An Excerpt From Ommadawn - Part II" (M. Oldfield) – 3:25

Virgin VDJ-9

Side 2 is "On Horseback". Issued in a generic cover for promo records.

=== USA seven-inch single ===
- "Theme From Ommadawn" (Oldfield)
- "On Horseback" (music: M. Oldfield; lyrics: M. Oldfield / W. Murray) – 3:25

Virgin (dist. CBS) ZS8-9505

Also issued in Canada.

=== Canada seven-inch single ===
- "Theme From Ommadawn" (Oldfield)
- "In Dulci Jubilo" (J. S. Bach / M. Oldfield) – 2:49

Virgin (dist. CBS) ZS8-9509

Re-issue with alternate B-side.

=== France seven-inch single ===
- "Ommadawn" (Oldfield) – 3:28
- "In Dulci Jubilo" (J. S. Bach / M. Oldfield) – 2:49

Virgin (dist. CPF Barclay) 640079 : 1st ed. 1975
Virgin (dist. Polydor) 2097 930: 2nd ed. 1977

This single has been re-issued in 1977 with another picture sleeve. The B-side has been called "In Dulce Jubilo", and credited to "R.L. Pearsall, arrt Mike Oldfield". The A-side is an edited version of the end of Ommadawn part 1. This may not be the same excerpt from Ommadawn used on North American singles.

=== EP ===
1. "In Dulci Jubilo" (J. S. Bach / M. Oldfield) – 2:49
2. "Wonderful Land" (Jerry Lordan) – 2:48
3. "Portsmouth" - (traditional, arr. Oldfield) 2:01
4. "Vivaldi Concerto In C" – 3:52

Released in 1993 on CD.
