= Islands (Mike Oldfield album) =

Studio album by Mike Oldfield
- Released: 28 September 1987
- Recorded: 1986–1987 in Megève, France
- Genres: Progressive rock, pop, rock
- Length: 48:11
- Label: Virgin
- Producers: Michael Cretu; Geoffrey Downes; Tom Newman; Mike Oldfield; Simon Phillips; Alan Shacklock

Mike Oldfield chronology
The Killing Fields (1984)	Islands (1987)	Earth Moving (1989)

Alternative cover
- Original United States cover

Singles from Islands
- 1. "Islands" Released: 7 September 1987; 2. "The Time Has Come" Released: 30 November 1987 (UK); 3. "Magic Touch" Released: November 1987 (US); 4. "Flying Start" Released: 1 February 1988

Professional ratings
Review scores
Source	Rating
AllMusic	3/5 stars

Islands is the eleventh studio album by English musician Mike Oldfield, released on 28 September 1987 by Virgin in the UK. Guest singers on the album are Bonnie Tyler, Kevin Ayers, Anita Hegerland, Max Bacon, and Jim Price. A different track list and cover was used for the American edition.

== Background ==
Islands was also released as a full-length VHS video album. For each track a video was made and released, often mixing state of the art (for the time) computer-generated images with real life images. This was released as part of The Wind Chimes video.

The album boasts the largest number of co-producers out of all of Oldfield's work; production was handled by Michael Cretu (later of Enigma fame), Geoffrey Downes, Tom Newman, Simon Phillips, Alan Shacklock, and Oldfield himself. Singers on the album are Bonnie Tyler, Kevin Ayers, Anita Hegerland, Max Bacon, and Jim Price.

"Flying Start" was released as the third single from Islands on 1 February 1988. It features Kevin Ayers on vocals who had collaborated with Oldfield in his band, The Whole World, prior to Oldfield's debut album, Tubular Bells. Oldfield used a Danelectro Coral sitar on this song, an instrument that does not feature on many of Oldfield's releases. A different version of the song produced by Colin Fairley was also released on Kevin Ayers' own album Falling Up in February 1988. The music video features various computer generated elements.

== Album artwork ==
The UK front cover artwork was of a tropical island, and hidden in the surrounding sea is a large number of hand shapes. The hand images are based on a still frame from the longform video released at the same time as the album; a couple of scenes in the video, which was mainly filmed in Bali, feature a group of natives performing a ritualistic dance which involves hand-waving movements. The American cover is completely different; it displays two cube shapes. The photography on the back of the US version was by Jerry Uelsmann.

== Track listing ==
All tracks composed by Mike Oldfield.

1987 UK release

Side one

1. "The Wind Chimes (Part One and Part Two)" – 21:49

Side two

1. "Islands" – 4:19 (vocals by Bonnie Tyler)
2. "Flying Start" – 3:36 (vocals by Kevin Ayers)
3. "North Point" – 3:33 (vocals by Anita Hegerland)
4. "Magic Touch" – 4:14 (vocals by Jim Price)
5. "The Time Has Come" – 3:51 (vocals by Anita Hegerland)
6. "When the Night's on Fire" (Bonus track on CD version) – 6:41 (vocals by Anita Hegerland)

Original 1988 US release

Side one

1. "The Wind Chimes (Part one)" – 2:33
2. "The Wind Chimes (Part two)" – 19:14

Side two

1. "Magic Touch" (Original Max Bacon vocal) – 4:14
2. "The Time Has Come" – 3:51
3. "North Point" – 3:31
4. "Flying Start" – 3:36
5. "Islands" – 4:19

== Personnel ==
- Mike Oldfield – electric and acoustic guitars, electric sitar (on "Flying Start"), bass guitar, keyboards, percussion, vocals
- Micky Moody – electric guitars
- Rick Fenn – acoustic and electric guitars
- Phil Spalding – bass guitar
- Mickey Simmonds – keyboards
- Anita Hegerland – vocals (on "The Wind Chimes", "North Point", "The Time Has Come", "When the Night's on Fire")
- Bonnie Tyler – vocals (on "Islands")
- Kevin Ayers – vocals (on "Flying Start")
- Max Bacon – vocals (on "Magic Touch" [1988 US Issue]; backing vocals on "Islands")
- Jim Price – vocals (on "Magic Touch" [1987 UK Issue])
- Mervyn Spence – backing vocals (on "Magic Touch")
- Raf Ravenscroft – saxophone (on "Islands")
- Andy Mackay – saxophone, oboe
- Björn J:son Lindh – flute (on "The Wind Chimes")
- Simon Phillips – drums (on "The Wind Chimes")
- Pierre Moerlen – drums, vibraphone
- Tony Beard – drums
- Benoit Moerlen – vibraphone, percussion

== Charts ==
=== Weekly charts ===
Chart (1987)	Peak position
Austrian Albums (Ö3 Austria)	10
Dutch Albums (Album Top 100)	71
German Albums (Offizielle Top 100)	9
Norwegian Albums (VG-lista)	9
Spain (PROMUSICAE)	4
Swedish Albums (Sverigetopplistan)	12
Swiss Albums (Schweizer Hitparade)	4
UK Albums (Official Charts)	29
US Albums Billboard	138

=== Year-end charts ===
Chart (1988)	Position
German Albums (Offizielle Top 100)	75

The major single in Europe was the title track, "Islands", which was sung by Bonnie Tyler. In the United States, "Magic Touch" was a top 10 hit on the Billboard Hot Mainstream Rock Tracks charts in early 1988.

== Certifications ==
Region	Certification	Certified units/sales
France (SNEP)	Gold	100,000^{*}
Germany (BVMI)	Gold	250,000^{^}
Spain (Promusicae)	Platinum	100,000^{^}
Switzerland (IFPI Switzerland)	Gold	25,000^{^}
United Kingdom (BPI)	Gold	100,000^{^}
^{*} Sales figures based on certification alone.^{^} Shipments figures based on certification alone.
