= Tom Newman (musician) =

British record producer and musician

- Born: Thomas Dennis Newman; 7 May 1943 (age 83); Perivale, England
- Occupations: Record producer, musician
- Instrument: Guitar
- Years active: 1960s-present

Thomas Dennis Newman (born 7 May 1943) is an English record producer and musician. In 1970 he began working with Richard Branson and helped to found The Manor Studio in Oxford for the nascent Virgin Records. There he produced the recording of Mike Oldfield's Tubular Bells.

== Career ==
In 1968 Newman played in a band called July whose only album was the eponymous July on UK Major Minor and US Epic. Before that he was in a British band called The Tomcats who played around London and later in Spain. In 1966, they recorded at least three EPs on Spanish Philips (436387, 436388 and 436826). Also an amateur painter, one of his paintings can be seen during the Beatles' rooftop concert behind the drum set.

In 1970, Newman began working with Richard Branson and helped build The Manor Studio in Oxford. While there he met the 18-year-old Mike Oldfield who lent him a rough demo tape of what would become Tubular Bells.

In November 1973, Newman participated in a live-in-the-studio performance of Tubular Bells for the BBC. It is available on Oldfield's Elements DVD.

Newman released some albums as a solo musician and produced several albums for other artists, most notably Mike Oldfield (Tubular Bells, Tubular Bells II, Heaven's Open).

Reviewing Newman's 1977 Fine Old Tom LP, Robert Christgau wrote in Christgau's Record Guide: Rock Albums of the Seventies (1981): "Tom seems to have recorded this far across the sea in 1975, but more than that even my Anglophile sources can't tell me. Analogies: Dave Edmunds (studiomania and general non-esoteric musical orientation, although Newman isn't interested in overpowering anyone), Ray Davies (vaguely but persistently, for both eccentricity and vocal approach), Eno (more precisely, not only for eccentricity and vocal approach but also for style of smarts, although Newman isn't so blatantly avant-garde). Pretty catchy."

Newman also worked with young NWOBHM bands like Charlie ’Ungry.

== Discography ==
=== Solo albums ===
- Fine Old Tom (1975)
- Live at the Argonaut (1975) – Never released by Virgin, except test-pressings. Only released under Voiceprint label in 1995
- Faerie Symphony (1977)
- Bayou Moon (1986)
- Aspects (1986)
- Ozymandias (1988)
- Hotel Splendide [Live] (1997)
- Snow Blind (1997)
- Faerie Symphony and Other Stories (1999)
- Tall Scary Things (1999)
- The Hound Of Ulster (1999)
- The Secret Life of Angels (2014)
- The Calling (2015)
- A Faerie Symphony II (2021)

=== As producer ===
Not a complete list

- Tubular Bells – Mike Oldfield (1973)
- "Froggy Went A-Courting" – Mike Oldfield (1974)
- Hatfield and the North – Hatfield and the North (1973)
- Hergest Ridge – Mike Oldfield (1974)
- Platinum – Mike Oldfield (1979)
- "All Right Now" (unreleased single) – Mike Oldfield (1980)
- Celebration - Sally Oldfield (1980)
- 101 Live Letters (1981)
- Doll By Doll – Doll By Doll (1981)
- Grand Passion – Doll By Doll (1982) Co-producer with Jackie Leven
- Five Miles Out – Mike Oldfield (1982) Co-producer
- Captured – Natasha (1982)
- Islands – Mike Oldfield (1987)
- Amarok – Mike Oldfield (1990)
- Heaven's Open – Mike Oldfield (1991)
- Tubular Bells II – Mike Oldfield (1992)
- Six Elementary Songs – Clodagh Simonds (1996)
- Neon Emptiness EP – Cyan2 (1999)
