= Mike Oldfield =

English musician (born 1953)

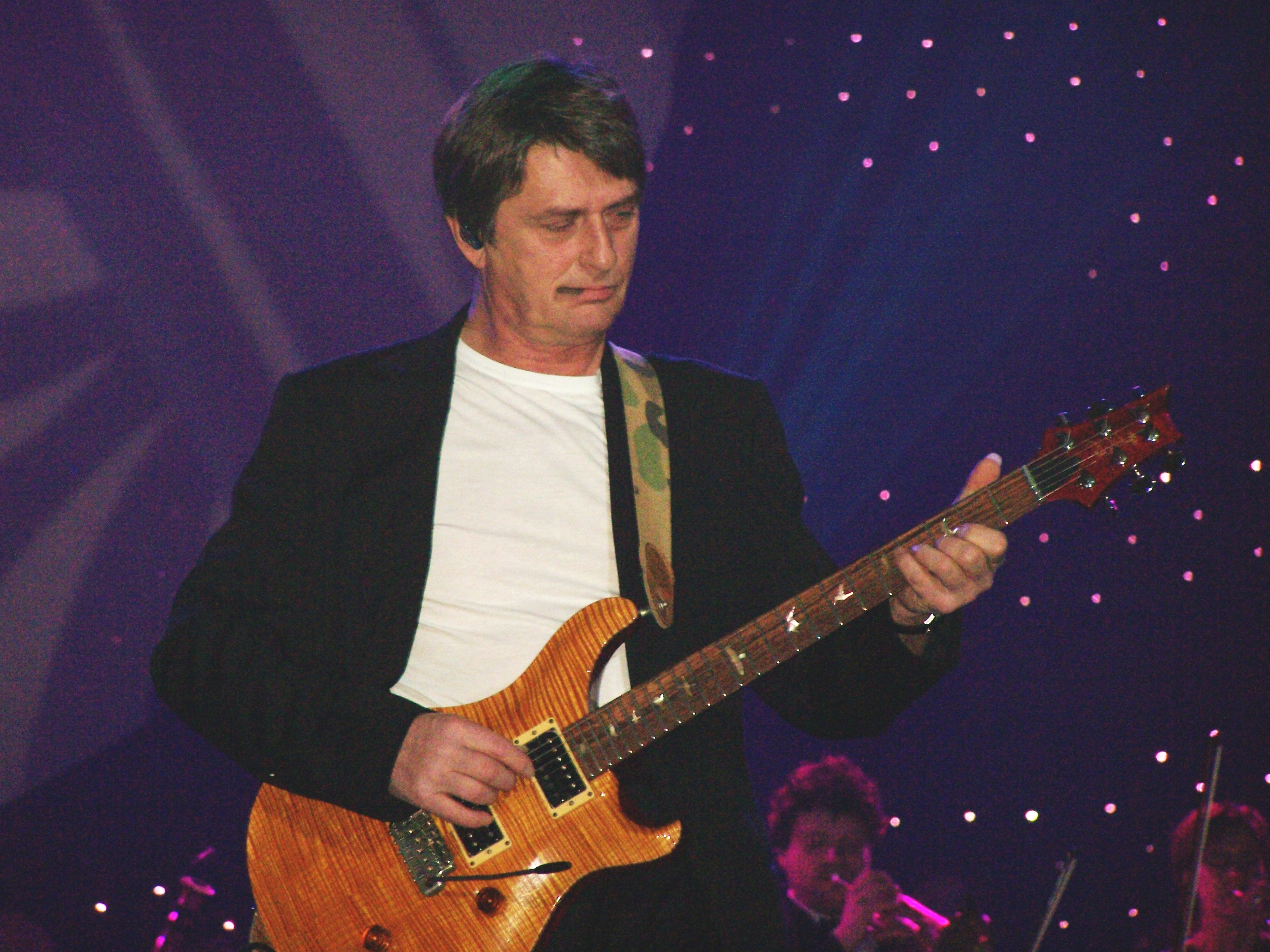
- Oldfield at the Night of the Proms in 2006

Background information
- Born: Michael Gordon Oldfield; 15 May 1953 (age 73); Reading, Berkshire, England
- Genres: Progressive rock; world; folk; classical; ambient; new-age; pop; experimental; minimalist
- Occupations: Musician; songwriter; record producer; video game designer
- Instruments: Guitar; bass; keyboards; percussion; vocals
- Works: Albums; singles
- Years active: 1967–2023
- Labels: Virgin; Warner Bros.; Mercury/Virgin EMI/Universal
- Formerly of: The Sallyangie
- Spouse: Diana Fuller (m. 1978; div. 1978) Fanny Vandekerckhove (m. 2002; div. 2013)
- Partner(s): Sally Cooper (1979–1986); Anita Hegerland (1986–1991)
- Website: mikeoldfieldofficial.com

Michael Gordon Oldfield (born 15 May 1953) is a retired English musician, songwriter and producer best known for his debut album Tubular Bells (1973), which became an unexpected critical and commercial success. Though primarily a guitarist, Oldfield played a range of instruments, which included keyboards and percussion, as well as vocals. He had adopted a range of musical styles throughout his career, including progressive rock, world, folk, classical, electronic, ambient and new age music. His discography includes 25 studio albums, nine of which have reached the UK top ten.

Oldfield took up the guitar at age ten and left school in his teens to embark on a music career. From 1967 to 1970, he and his sister Sally Oldfield were a folk duo, the Sallyangie, after which he performed with Kevin Ayers before starting work on Tubular Bells in 1971. The album caught the attention of Richard Branson, who agreed to make it the first-ever release on his new label Virgin Records. Its opening was used in the horror film The Exorcist, and the album went on to sell over 2.7 million copies in the UK. Oldfield followed it with Hergest Ridge (1974), Ommadawn (1975) and Incantations (1978). Like Tubular Bells, these albums consist of longform, mostly instrumental pieces.

In the late 1970s, Oldfield began to tour and release more commercial and song-based music, beginning with Platinum (1979), QE2 (1980) and Five Miles Out (1982). His most successful album of this period was Crises (1983), which features the worldwide hit single "Moonlight Shadow," with the vocalist Maggie Reilly. After leaving Virgin and signing with WEA, the 1990s saw him release Tubular Bells II (1992) and Tubular Bells III (1998) among other albums, and he experimented with virtual reality and gaming content with his MusicVR project. In 2012, Oldfield performed at the opening ceremony for the 2012 Olympic Games held in London, while 2017 saw the release of his final album, Return to Ommadawn. Oldfield's label announced his retirement in 2023.

== Early life ==
Michael Gordon Oldfield was born in Reading, Berkshire, on 15 May 1953, to Raymond Henry Oldfield (1923–2016), an English general practitioner, and Maureen (née Liston; 1919–1975), an Irish nurse from Charleville, County Cork, who emigrated to England to pursue a career in nursing. Oldfield has two elder siblings, sister Sally and brother Terence. In 1959, when Oldfield was six, his mother gave birth to a younger brother, David, who had Down syndrome. The parents dropped off David in an institution and lied to Mike, Sally and Terence that the baby had died in infancy. His mother was prescribed barbiturates, to which she became addicted, and developed mental health problems. She spent much of the rest of her life in mental institutions and died in early 1975, shortly after Oldfield had started writing Ommadawn. Oldfield attended Highlands Junior School, followed by St. Edward's Preparatory School and Presentation College, all in Reading. When he was thirteen, the family moved to Harold Wood, Essex, and Oldfield attended Hornchurch Grammar School where, having already displayed musical talent, he earned one GCE qualification in English.

Oldfield took up the guitar aged ten, first learning on a 6-string acoustic which his father had given to him. He learned technique by copying parts from songs, by folk guitarists Bert Jansch and John Renbourn, that he played on a portable record player. He tried to learn musical notation but was a "very, very slow" learner, saying: "If I have to, I can write things down. But I don't like to." By the time he was twelve, Oldfield played the electric guitar and performed in local folk and youth clubs and dances, earning as much as £4 (equivalent to £68 in 2025) per gig. During a six-month break from music that Oldfield had around this time, he took up painting. In May 1968, when Oldfield turned fifteen, his school headmaster requested that he cut his long hair. Oldfield refused, left abruptly and never returned. It was at this point when he decided to pursue music on a full-time, professional basis.

== Career ==
=== 1968–1972: Early career ===
After leaving school Oldfield accepted an invitation from his sister Sally to form a folk duo the Sallyangie, taking its name from her name and Oldfield's favourite Jansch tune, "Angie". They toured England and Paris and signed a deal with Transatlantic Records, for which they recorded one album, Children of the Sun (1969). After they split in the following year Oldfield had a nervous breakdown. He auditioned as bassist for Family in 1969 following the departure of Ric Grech, but the group did not share Roger Chapman's enthusiasm towards Oldfield's performance. Oldfield spent much of the next year living off his father and performing in an electric rock band named Barefoot that included his brother Terry on flute, until the group disbanded in early 1970.

In February 1970, Oldfield auditioned to become the bassist in the Whole World, a new backing band that former Soft Machine vocalist Kevin Ayers was putting together. He landed the position despite the bass being a new instrument for him, but he also played occasional lead guitar and later looked back on this time as providing valuable training on the bass. Oldfield went on to play on Ayers's albums Shooting at the Moon (1970) and Whatevershebringswesing (1971), and played mandolin on Edgar Broughton Band (1971). All three albums were recorded at Abbey Road Studios, where Oldfield familiarised himself with a variety of instruments, such as orchestral percussion, piano, Mellotron and harpsichord, and started to write and put down musical ideas of his own. While doing so Oldfield took up work as a reserve guitarist in a stage production of Hair at the Shaftesbury Theatre, where he played and gigged with Alex Harvey. After ten performances Oldfield grew bored of the job and was fired after he decided to play his part for "Let the Sunshine In" in 7/8 time.

=== 1971–1991: Virgin years ===
==== Tubular Bells ====
By mid-1971, Oldfield had assembled a demo tape containing sections of a longform instrumental piece initially titled "Opus One". Attempts to secure a recording deal to record it professionally came to nothing. In September 1971, Oldfield, now a session musician and bassist for the Arthur Louis Band, attended recording sessions at The Manor Studio at Shipton-on-Cherwell, Oxfordshire, owned by businessman Richard Branson and run by engineers Tom Newman and Simon Heyworth. Branson already had several business ventures and was about to launch Virgin Records with Simon Draper. Newman and Heyworth heard some of Oldfield's demos and took them to Branson and Draper, who eventually gave Oldfield one week of recording time at The Manor, after which Oldfield had completed what became "Part One" of his composition, Tubular Bells. He recorded "Part Two" mostly at night in the studio downtime, from February to April 1973. Branson agreed to release Tubular Bells as the first record on the Virgin label and secured Oldfield a six-album deal with an additional four albums as optional.

Tubular Bells was released on 25 May 1973. Oldfield played more than twenty different instruments in the multi-layered recording, and its style moved through diverse musical genres. Its 2,760,000 UK sales puts it at No. 42 on the list of the best-selling albums in the country. The title track became a top-10 hit single in the US after the opening was used in the film The Exorcist in 1973. It is today considered to be a forerunner of the new-age music movement.

==== Hergest Ridge to Incantations ====
In 1974, Oldfield played the guitar on the critically acclaimed album Rock Bottom by Robert Wyatt.

In late 1974, his follow-up LP, Hergest Ridge, was No. 1 in the UK for three weeks before being dethroned by Tubular Bells. Although Hergest Ridge was released over a year after Tubular Bells, it reached No. 1 first. Tubular Bells spent 11 weeks (10 of them consecutive) at No. 2 before its one week at the top. Like Tubular Bells, Hergest Ridge is a two-movement instrumental piece, this time evoking scenes from Oldfield's Herefordshire country retreat. It was followed in 1975 by the pioneering world music piece Ommadawn released after the death of his mother, Maureen.

In 1975, Oldfield recorded a version of the Christmas piece "In Dulci Jubilo" which charted at No. 4 in the UK.

In 1975, Oldfield received a Grammy award for Best Instrumental Composition in "Tubular Bells – Theme from The Exorcist".

In 1976, Oldfield and his sister joined his friend and band member Pekka Pohjola to play on his album Mathematician's Air Display, which was released in 1977. The album was recorded and edited at Oldfield's Througham Slad Manor in Gloucestershire by Oldfield and Paul Lindsay. Oldfield's 1976 rendition of "Portsmouth" remains his best-performing single on the UK Singles Chart, reaching No. 3.

Oldfield recorded the double album Incantations between December 1977 and September 1978. This introduced more diverse choral performances from Sally Oldfield, Maddy Prior and the Queen's College Girls Choir. When it was released on 1 December 1978, the album went to No. 14 in the UK and reached platinum certification for 300,000 copies sold.

In 1979, Oldfield supported Incantations with a European tour that spanned 21 dates between March and May 1979. The tour was documented with the live album and concert film, Exposed. Initially marketed as a limited pressing of 100,000 copies, the strength of sales for the album were strong enough for Virgin to abandon the idea shortly after, transferring it to regular production. During the tour Oldfield released the disco-influenced non-album single "Guilty", for which he went to New York City to find the best session musicians and write a song with them in mind. He wrote a chord chart for the song and presented it to the group, who completed it in the studio. Released in April 1979, the song went to No. 22 in the UK and Oldfield performed the song on the national television show Top of the Pops.

Oldfield's music was used for the score of The Space Movie (1980), a Virgin Films production that celebrated the tenth anniversary of the Apollo 11 mission. In 1979, he recorded a version of the signature tune for the BBC children's television programme Blue Peter, which was used by the show for 10 years.

==== Platinum to Heaven's Open ====
Oldfield's fifth album, Platinum, was released in November 1979 and marked the start of his transition from long compositions towards mainstream and pop music. Oldfield performed on tour across Europe between April and December 1980.

In 1980, Oldfield released QE2, named after the ocean liner, which features a variety of guest musicians including Phil Collins on drums. This was followed by the European Adventure Tour 1981, during which Oldfield accepted an invitation to perform at a free concert celebrating the wedding of Prince Charles and Lady Diana in Guildhall. He wrote a new track, "Royal Wedding Anthem", for the occasion.

His next album, Five Miles Out, followed in March 1982, with the 24-minute track "Taurus II" occupying the whole of side one. The Five Miles Out World Tour 1982 saw Oldfield perform from April to December of that year. Crises saw Oldfield continue the pattern of one long composition with shorter songs. The first single from the album, "Moonlight Shadow", with Maggie Reilly on vocals, became Oldfield's most successful single, reaching No. 4 in the UK and No. 1 in nine other countries. The subsequent Crises Tour in 1983 concluded with a concert at Wembley Arena to commemorate the tenth anniversary of Tubular Bells. The next album, Discovery, continues with this trend, being the first single "To France" and subsequent Discovery Tour 1984.

Oldfield later turned to film and video, writing the score for Roland Joffé's acclaimed film The Killing Fields and producing substantial video footage for his album Islands. Islands continued what Oldfield had been doing on the past couple of albums, with an instrumental piece on one side and rock/pop singles on the other. Of these, "Islands", sung by Bonnie Tyler and "Magic Touch", with vocals by Max Bacon (in the US version) and Glasgow vocalist Jim Price (Southside Jimmy) in the rest of the world, were the major hits. In the US "Magic Touch" reached the top 10 on the Billboard album rock charts in 1988. During the 1980s, Oldfield's then-partner, Norwegian singer Anita Hegerland, contributed vocals to many songs including "Pictures in the Dark".

Released in July 1989, Earth Moving features seven vocalists across the album's nine tracks. It is Oldfield's first to consist solely of rock and pop songs, several of which were released as singles: "Innocent" and "Holy" in Europe and "Hostage" in the US.

For his next instrumental album, Virgin insisted that Oldfield use the title Tubular Bells 2. Oldfield's rebellious response was Amarok, an hour-long work featuring rapidly changing themes, unpredictable bursts of noise and a hidden Morse code insult, stating "Fuck off RB", allegedly directed at Branson. Oldfield did everything in his power to make it impossible to make extracts and Virgin returned the favour by barely promoting the album.

In February 1991, Oldfield released his final album for Virgin, Heaven's Open, under the name "Michael Oldfield". It marks the first time he handles all lead vocals. In 2013, Oldfield invited Branson to the opening of St. Andrew's International School of The Bahamas, where two of Oldfield's children were pupils. This was the occasion of the debut of Tubular Bells for Schools, a piano solo adaptation of Oldfield's work.

=== 1992–2003: Warner years ===
By early 1992, Oldfield had secured Clive Banks as his new manager and had several record label owners listen to his demo of Tubular Bells II at his house. Oldfield signed with Rob Dickins of WEA Warner and recorded the album with Trevor Horn as producer. Released in August 1992, the album went to No. 1 in the UK. Its live premiere followed on 4 September at Edinburgh Castle which was released on home video as Tubular Bells II Live. Oldfield supported the album with his Tubular Bells II 20th Anniversary Tour in 1992 and 1993, his first concert tour since 1984. By April 1993, the album had sold over three million copies worldwide.

Oldfield continued to embrace new musical styles, with The Songs of Distant Earth (based on Arthur C. Clarke's novel of the same name) exhibiting a softer new-age sound. In 1994, he also had an asteroid, 5656 Oldfield, named after him.

In 1995 Oldfield continued to embrace new musical styles by producing the Celtic-themed album Voyager. In 1992, Oldfield met Luar na Lubre, a Galician Celtic-folk band (from A Coruña, Spain), with the singer Rosa Cedrón. The band's popularity grew after Oldfield covered their song "O son do ar" ("The sound of the air") on his Voyager album.

In 1998 Oldfield produced the third Tubular Bells album (also premiered at a concert, this time in Horse Guards Parade, London), drawing on the dance music scene at his then new home on the island of Ibiza. This album was inspired by themes from Tubular Bells, but differed in lacking a clear two-part structure.

During 1999 Oldfield released two albums. The first, Guitars, used guitars as the source for all the sounds on the album, including percussion. The second, The Millennium Bell, consisted of pastiches of a number of styles of music that represented various historical periods over the past millennium. The work was performed live in Berlin for the city's millennium celebrations in 1999–2000.

He added to his repertoire the MusicVR project, combining his music with a virtual reality-based computer game. His first work on this project is Tres Lunas launched in 2002, a virtual game where the player can interact with a world full of new music. This project appeared as a double CD, one with the music and the other with the game.

In 2002 and 2003, Oldfield re-recorded Tubular Bells, using modern equipment, to coincide with the 30th anniversary of the original. He had wanted to do it years before, but his contract with Virgin had kept him from doing so. This new version featured John Cleese as the Master of Ceremonies, since Vivian Stanshall, who had appeared on the original, had died in 1995. Tubular Bells 2003 was released in May 2003.

=== 2004–present: Mercury years ===
On 12 April 2004, Oldfield launched his next virtual reality project, Maestro, which contains music from the Tubular Bells 2003 album and some new chillout melodies. The games have since been made available free of charge on Tubular.net.

In 2005 Oldfield signed a deal with Mercury Records UK, who secured the rights to his catalogue when the rights had reverted to himself. Mercury acquired the rights to Oldfield's back catalogue, in July 2007. Oldfield released his first album on the Mercury label, Light + Shade, in September 2005. It is a double album of music of contrasting mood: relaxed (Light) and upbeat and moody (Shade). In 2006 and 2007, Oldfield headlined the Night of the Proms tour, consisting of 21 concerts across Europe. Also in 2007, Oldfield released his autobiography, Changeling.

In March 2008, Oldfield released his first classical album, Music of the Spheres; Karl Jenkins assisted with the orchestration. In the first week of release the album topped the UK Classical chart and reached No. 9 on the main UK Album Chart. A single "Spheres", featuring a demo version of pieces from the album, was released digitally. The album was nominated for a Classical Brit Award, the NS&I Best Album of 2009.

In 2008, when Oldfield's original 35-year deal with Virgin Records ended, the rights to Tubular Bells and his other Virgin releases were returned to him, and were then transferred to Mercury Records. Mercury announced that his Virgin albums would be reissued with bonus content from 2009. In 2009, Mercury released the compilation album The Mike Oldfield Collection 1974–1983, that went to No. 11 in the UK chart.

In 2008 Oldfield contributed a new track, "Song for Survival", to the charity album Songs for Survival in support of Survival International. In 2010, lyricist Don Black said that he had been working with Oldfield. In 2012 Oldfield was featured on Journey into Space, an album by his brother Terry, and on the track "Islanders" by German producer Torsten Stenzel's York project. In 2013, Oldfield and York released a remix album entitled Tubular Beats.

Oldfield performed live at the 2012 Summer Olympics opening ceremony in London. His set included renditions of Tubular Bells, "Far Above the Clouds" and "In Dulci Jubilo" during a segment about the National Health Service. This track appears on the officially released soundtrack album Isles of Wonder. Later in 2012, the compilation album Two Sides: The Very Best of Mike Oldfield was released and reached No. 6 in the UK.

In October 2013, the BBC broadcast Tubular Bells: The Mike Oldfield Story, a documentary on Oldfield's life and career. Oldfield's rock-themed album of songs, titled Man on the Rocks, was released on 3 March 2014 by Virgin EMI. The album was produced by Steve Lipson. The album marked a return of Oldfield to a Virgin branded label, through the merger of Mercury Records UK and Virgin Records after Universal Music's purchase of EMI. The track "Nuclear" was used for the E3 trailer of Metal Gear Solid V: The Phantom Pain.

In 2015 Oldfield told Steve Wright on his BBC radio show that a sequel album to Tubular Bells was in early development, which he aimed to record on analogue equipment. Later in 2015, Oldfield revealed that he had started on a sequel to Ommadawn. The album, named Return to Ommadawn, was finished in 2016 and released in January 2017. It went to No. 4 in the UK. Oldfield again hinted at a fourth Tubular Bells album when he posted photos of his new equipment, including a new Telecaster guitar.

A 50th anniversary edition of Tubular Bells was released on 26 May 2023. It features a new master of the original album along with an additional previously unreleased 8-minute track, the "Introduction to Tubular Bells 4". "Introduction to Tubular Bells 4" was recorded by Oldfield as a demo in 2017. His record label indicated that he had decided not to go forward with the Tubular Bells 4 project and that this "may well be the last piece ever to be recorded by Oldfield".

In 2025, a series of releases and anniversary editions of Oldfield's early material were announced. In early 2025, a vinyl reissue of Tubular Bells 2003 was released. On 27 June 2025, a 50th-anniversary expanded edition of his second album, Hergest Ridge, was released. It featured a new half-speed vinyl master and surround sound mixes. This was followed in September 2025 by the first official release of The Orchestral Hergest Ridge, a recording of the 1975 performance at Kelvin Hall, Glasgow, arranged by David Bedford and featuring Steve Hillage.

Additionally, a 35th-anniversary edition of the 1990 album Amarok was released on 31 October 2025, featuring a new half-speed remaster and expanded artwork.

On 12 August 2026, to accompany the total solar eclipse, the orchestral project Opus One celebrated the music of Mike Oldfied by performing Tubular Bells, Hergest Ridge, and Ommadawn in full, joined by guest vocalist Rosa Cedrón at the Cerro del Otero in Palencia, Spain.

== Musicianship ==
Oldfield's 1970s recordings were characterised by a very broad variety of instrumentation predominantly played by himself, plus assorted guitar sound treatments to suggest other instrumental timbres (such as the "bagpipe", "mandolin", "Glorfindel" and varispeed guitars on the original Tubular Bells). During the 1980s Oldfield became expert in the use of digital synthesizers and sequencers (notably the Fairlight CMI) which began to dominate the sound of his recordings: from the late 1990s onwards, he became a keen user of software synthesizers. He has, however, regularly returned to projects emphasising detailed, manually played and part-acoustic instrumentation (such as 1990's Amarok, 1996's Voyager and 1999's Guitars).

While generally preferring the sound of guest vocalists, Oldfield has frequently sung both lead and backup parts for his songs and compositions. He has also contributed experimental vocal effects such as fake choirs and the notorious "Piltdown Man" impression on Tubular Bells.

=== Guitars ===
Over the years, Oldfield has used a range of guitars. Among the more notable of these are:

1963 (Note: Also quoted as 1961 and 1962.) Fender Stratocaster
Serial no. L08044, in salmon pink (fiesta red). Used by Oldfield from 1984 (the Discovery album) until 2006 (Night of the Proms, rehearsals in Antwerp). Subsequently, sold for £30,000 at Chandler Guitars.
1989 PRS Artist Custom 24
In amber, used by Oldfield from the late 1980s to the present day.
1966 Fender Telecaster
Serial no. 180728, in blonde. Previously owned by Marc Bolan, this was the only electric guitar used on Tubular Bells. The guitar was unsold at auction by Bonhams in 2007, 2008 and 2009 at estimated values of, respectively, £25,000–35,000, £10,000–15,000 and £8,000–12,000; Oldfield has since sold it and donated the £6500 received to the charity SANE.
Various Gibson Les Paul, Zemaitis and SG guitars
Used extensively by Oldfield in the 1970s and 1980s. The most notable Gibson guitar Oldfield favoured in this time period was a 1962 Les Paul/SG Junior model, which was his primary guitar for the recording of Ommadawn, among other works. Oldfield is also known to have owned and used an L6-S during that model's production run in the mid-1970s. On occasion, Oldfield was also seen playing a black Les Paul Custom, an early reissue model built around 1968.

Oldfield used a modified Roland GP8 effects processor in conjunction with his PRS Artist to get many of his heavily overdriven guitar sounds from the Earth Moving album onwards. Oldfield has also been using guitar synthesizers since the mid-1980s, using a 1980s Roland GR-300/G-808 type system, then a 1990s Roland GK2 equipped red PRS Custom 24 (sold in 2006) with a Roland VG8, and most recently a Line 6 Variax.

Oldfield has an unusual playing style, using fingers and long right-hand fingernails and different ways of creating vibrato: a "very fast side-to-side vibrato" and "violinist's vibrato". Oldfield has stated that his playing style originates from his musical roots playing folk music and the bass guitar.

=== Keyboards ===
Over the years, Oldfield has owned and used a vast number of synthesizers and other keyboard instruments. In the 1980s, he composed the score for the film The Killing Fields on a Fairlight CMI. Some examples of keyboard and synthesised instruments which Oldfield has made use of include Sequential Circuits Prophet-5s (notably on Platinum and The Killing Fields), Roland JV-1080/JV-2080 units (1990s), a Korg M1 (as seen in the "Innocent" video), a Clavia Nord Lead and Steinway pianos. In recent years, he has also made use of software synthesis products, such as Native Instruments.

=== Recording ===
Oldfield has self-recorded and produced many of his albums, and played the majority of the featured instruments, largely at his home studios. In the 1990s and 2000s he mainly used DAWs such as Apple Logic, Avid Pro Tools and Steinberg Nuendo as recording suites. For composing orchestral music Oldfield has been quoted as using the software notation program Sibelius running on Apple Macintoshes. He also used the FL Studio DAW on his 2005 double album Light + Shade. Among the mixing consoles Oldfield has owned are an AMS Neve Capricorn 33238, a Harrison Series X, and a Euphonix System 5-MC.

== Personal life ==
=== Family ===
In 1978, Oldfield married Diana Fuller, a relative of the Exegesis group leader. The marriage lasted for three months. Oldfield recalled that he phoned label boss Richard Branson the day after the ceremony and said he had made a mistake. From 1979 to 1986, Oldfield was in a relationship with Sally Cooper, whom he met through Virgin. They had three children. In 2015, his son Dougal died after collapsing while working at a film production company in London. By the time of birth of their third child, in 1986, the relationship had broken down and they amicably split. Oldfield entered a relationship with Norwegian singer Anita Hegerland that lasted until 1991. The pair met backstage at one of Oldfield's gigs while touring Germany in 1984. They lived in Switzerland, France and England. They have two children.

In the late 1990s, Oldfield posted in a lonely hearts column in a local Ibiza newspaper. It was answered by Amy Lauer; the pair dated, but the relationship was troubled by Oldfield's bouts of alcohol and substance abuse and it ended after two months. In 2001, Oldfield began counselling and psychotherapy. Between 2002 and 2013, Oldfield was married to Fanny Vandekerckhove, whom he met while living in Ibiza. They have two sons.

=== Other ===
Oldfield and his siblings were raised as Catholic, their mother's faith.

In June 1978, during the recording of Incantations, Oldfield and his siblings completed a three-day Exegesis seminar, a self-assertiveness programme based on Werner Erhard's EST training programme. The experience had a significant effect on Oldfield's personality, who recalled that he underwent a "rebirth experience" by reliving past fears. "It was like opening some huge cathedral doors and facing the monster, and I saw that the monster was myself as a newborn infant, because I'd started life in a panic." Following the Exegesis seminar, the formerly reclusive Oldfield granted press interviews, posed nude for a promotional photo shoot for Incantations and went drinking with news reporters. He had also conquered his fear of flying, gained a pilot's licence and bought his own plane.

He used drugs in his early life, including LSD, which he said affected his mental health. In the early 1990s, Oldfield set up Tonic, a foundation that sponsored people to receive counselling and therapy. Oldfield's spiritual outlook emphasizes broad awareness over doctrinal commitment, incorporating daily Transcendental Meditation since at least the early 2000s while expressing affinity for the focused energy in churches irrespective of religion.

In 1980, Oldfield, a longtime fan of model aircraft, acquired his pilot's licence. He later became a motorcycle enthusiast and has been inspired to write songs from riding them. He has owned various models, including a BMW R1200GS, Suzuki GSX-R750, Suzuki GSX-R1000 and a Yamaha R1.

Oldfield has lived in Nassau, Bahamas, since 2009 and is a Bahamian citizen. He has also lived in Spain, Los Angeles and Monaco. In 2012, Oldfield stated that he had decided to leave England after feeling that the country had become a "nanny state" with too much surveillance and state control. Oldfield has remarked that while he is close to other celebrity residents in the Bahamas, he chose not to live within a wealthy gated community with staff and described his lifestyle as "austere."

In 2017, Oldfield expressed support for then US President Donald Trump and said he would have played at Trump's inauguration if he had been invited to do so. In the same interview, he also stated that he was in favour of Brexit.

== Awards and nominations ==
| Award | Year | Nominee(s) | Category | Result | Ref. |
|---|---|---|---|---|---|
| APRS Annual Sound Fellowships Lunch | 2015 | Himself | Honour Fellowship | Won | |
| British Academy Film Awards | 1985 | The Killing Fields | Best Original Music | Nominated | |
| Brit Awards | 1977 | Tubular Bells | British Album of the Year | Nominated | |
| Daily Mirror The British Rock & Pop Awards | 1977 | Himself | Best Instrumentalist | Won | |
| Golden Globe Awards | 1985 | The Killing Fields | Best Original Score | Nominated | |
| Goldene Europa | 1987 | Himself | Best International Artist | Won | |
| Goldene Europa | 1998 | Himself | Best International Artist | Won | |
| Grammy Awards | 1975 | "Tubular Bells" | Best Instrumental Composition | Won | |
| Grammy Awards | 1998 | Voyager | Best New Age Album | Nominated | |
| Grammy Hall of Fame | 2018 | Tubular Bells | Album Induction | Won | |
| Hungarian Music Awards | 1997 | Voyager | Best Foreign Album | Nominated | |
| Ivor Novello Awards | 1984 | "Moonlight Shadow" | Most Performed Work | Nominated | |
| NME Awards | 1975 | Himself | Best Miscellaneous Instrumentalist | Won | |
| NME Awards | 1976 | Himself | Best Miscellaneous Instrumentalist | Won | |
| NME Awards | 1977 | Himself | Best Miscellaneous Instrumentalist | Won | |
| Online Film & Television Association | 1999 | The X-Files | Best Music, Original Sci-Fi/Fantasy/Horror Score | Nominated | |

== Honours ==
- In 1981, Oldfield was awarded the Freedom of the City of London.

== Discography ==
Studio albums

- Tubular Bells (1973)
- Hergest Ridge (1974)
- Ommadawn (1975)
- Incantations (1978)
- Platinum (1979)
- QE2 (1980)
- Five Miles Out (1982)
- Crises (1983)
- Discovery (1984)
- The Killing Fields (1984)
- Islands (1987)
- Earth Moving (1989)
- Amarok (1990)
- Heaven's Open (1991)
- Tubular Bells II (1992)
- The Songs of Distant Earth (1994)
- Voyager (1996)
- Tubular Bells III (1998)
- Guitars (1999)
- The Millennium Bell (1999)
- Tr3s Lunas (2002)
- Tubular Bells 2003 (2003)
- Light + Shade (2005)
- Music of the Spheres (2008)
- Man on the Rocks (2014)
- Return to Ommadawn (2017)

== Concert tours ==
- Tour of Europe 1979 (March–May 1979)
- In Concert 1980 (April–December 1980)
- European Adventure Tour '81 (March–August 1981)
- Five Miles Out World Tour 1982 (April–December 1982)
- Crises Tour 1983 (May–July 1983)
- Discovery Tour 1984 (August–November 1984)
- Tubular Bells II 20th Anniversary Tour (March–October 1993)
- Live Then & Now '99 (June–July 1999)
- Nokia Night of the Proms (December 2006)
- Night of the Proms Spain (March 2007)

== Bibliography ==
- Evans, Peter (1994). Music from the Darkness – Mike Oldfield, 1953–1993. Archived from the original on 16 December 2016.
- Branson, Richard (1998). Losing My Virginity. Virgin Books. ISBN 978-0-7535-0648-6.
- Oldfield, Mike (2007). Changeling. Virgin Books. ISBN 978-1-85227-381-1.
- Lemieux, Patrick (2014). The Mike Oldfield Chronology. Across The Board Books. ISBN 978-0-9919840-6-0.
- Tobal Cayuela, J.J. (2019). Mike Oldfield. Taurus. Editorial TBEditores. ISBN 978-84-948809-8-8
- Campos, Héctor (2018). Mike Oldfield: La música de los Sueños. Editorial Círculo Rojo. ISBN 978-84-1304-271-8
- Capitani, Ettore - Paolucci, Stefano (2020). Mike Oldfield. In Italia. Passamonti Editore. ISBN 979-8670270250.
- Gaevert, Thomas: Mike Oldfield – Klangmagier der Seele. GRIN Verlag, München 2025, ISBN 978-3389162002.

== Musical scores ==
- Oldfield, Mike (1972). Mike Oldfield's single (Theme from "Tubular Bells"). Virgin Music (Publishing) ltd. 1-49806-F.
- Oldfield, Mike (1984). Tubular Bells. Wise Publications. ISBN 978-0-86001-249-8. .Copyright 1973. Text written by Karl Dallas. Analysis by David Bedford. The text of this book originally appeared in "Let It Rock" magazine, December 1974, under the title of "Balm for the Walking Dead".
- Oldfield, Mike (1975). On Horseback. Virgin Music (Publishers) ltd. 1-49898-G.
- Oldfield, Mike (1976). In Dulci Jubilo. Music by J.S.Bach, Arranged by Mike Oldfield. Virgin Music (Publishers) ltd. 1-49008-G.
- Oldfield, Mike (1976). Portsmouth. Traditional, Arranged by Mike Oldfield. Virgin Music (Publishers) ltd. 1-0-50021-F.
- Oldfield, Mike (1979). Guilty. West Central Printing Co. ltd. / Virgin Music (Publishers) ltd. VR 80107.
- Ashworth-Hope, H. (1980). Blue Peter Theme (Barnacle Bill), As recorded by Mike Oldfield on Virgin Records and used on the BBC Television Series Blue Peter. EMI Music Publishing ltd. OCLC 810506300.
- Oldfield, Mike (1984). 10 years: 1973–1983. Virgin Music (Publishers) ltd. OCLC 256751247. VR 80594.
- Oldfield, Mike (1987). Mike Oldfield Hot Songs. IMP International Music Publications ltd. ISBN 1-85909-027-3.
- Oldfield, Mike (1988). IMP Presents Mike Oldfield: 8 Hits including Tubular bells. IMP International Music Publications ltd. ISBN 978-0-86359-464-9.
- Oldfield, Mike (1992). Tubular Bells II. IMP International Music Publications ltd. ISBN 978-0-86359-949-1.
- Oldfield, Mike (1993). Tubular Bells II Concert Score. IMP International Music Publications ltd. ISBN 1-85909-004-4.
- Oldfield, Mike (1994). Elements. The best of Mike Oldfield. Piano/Vocal/Guitar. IMP International Music Publications ltd. ISBN 1-85909-157-1.
- Oldfield, Mike (1999). Tubular Bells III. Piano/Vocal/Guitar. IMP International Music Publications ltd. ISBN 1-85909-617-4.
