= Exposed (Mike Oldfield video) =

Video by Mike Oldfield
- Released: October 24, 2005
- Recorded: April 1979; Wembley Conference Centre
- Genre: Progressive rock
- Label: Virgin

Mike Oldfield chronology
The Space Movie (1979)	Exposed (2005)	The Essential Live (1980)

Exposed is a live concert video by Mike Oldfield recorded in 1979 at Wembley Conference Centre. The live album of the same name was released in 1979; it also had the same artwork. A DVD version of the concert was released in 2005 (see 2005 in music). It was part of the Tour of Europe 1979.

The DVD release is split into two discs, like the CD, but this time because the viewer can choose their own viewing angles.

== Track listing ==
Disc one

1. Intro
2. "Incantations (Parts 1 & 2)"
3. "Incantations (Parts 3 & 4)"
4. Intermission

Disc two

1. "Tubular Bells (Part 1)"
2. "Guilty"
3. "Tubular Bells (Part 2)"
4. Encore

== Recording ==
Initially during the tour, the concerts were being recorded without the knowledge of the musicians, so that they could be paid just for the performance and not for the recording. The musicians found out about the practice, but the video was produced regardless.

Personnel
Guitars: Mike Oldfield, Nico Ramsden.
Guitar, Vocals: Phil Beer
Bass Guitar: Mike Oldfield, Nico Ramsden, Pekka Pohjola
Drums, Percussion: Pierre Moerlen
Percussion: Mike Frye, Benoit Moerlein, David Bedford
Bodhran: Ringo McDonough
Keyboards: Pete Lemer, Tim Cross
Vocals: Maddy Prior
Trumpets: Ray Gay, Ralph Izen, Simo Salminen, Colin Moore
Flutes: Sebastian Bell, Chris Nicholls
Violins: Dick Studt, Ben Cruft, Jane Price, Liz Edwards, Nicola Hurton, Jonathan Kahan
Violas: Don McVay, Pauline Mack, Danny Daggers, Melinda Daggers, Liz Butler, Ross Cohen
Celli: Nigel Warren Green, Vanessa Park, David Bucknall, Jessica Ford
Basses: Nick Worters, Joe Kirby
Choir: Debra Bronstein, Marigo Acheson, Emma Freud, Diana Coulson, Mary Elliot, Mary Creed, Cecily Hazell, Wendy Lampitt, Clara Harris, Emma Smith, Catherine Loewe

String arrangements: David Bedford

Extract from 'Hiawatha' by Henry Wadsworth Longfellow

Tour Co-ordinator: Sally Arnold
Original Sleeve concept & design: Pearce Marchbank.
Original photography: Chalkie Davies, Carol Starr, Sheila Rock, Tom Sheehan, Murray Close.

Executive recording supervisor: Phillip R. Newell
Recording Engineers: Alan Perkins, Greg Sriver, Kurt Munkacsi
Assistants: Ken Capper, Chris Blake
Recording unit: The Manor Studio's Mobile
Remixing studio: The Town House, London

Produced by Phillip R Newell and Mike Oldfield.
Project A&R: Jason Day
Project co-ordinator: Tom Wegg-Prosser
Reissue layout: Scott Minshall @ The Red Room
