= Exposed (Mike Oldfield album) =

Live album by Mike Oldfield
- Released: 27 July 1979
- Recorded: March–April 1979
- Genre: Progressive rock
- Length: 97:31
- Label: Virgin
- Producers: Philp R. Newell & Mike Oldfield

Mike Oldfield chronology
Incantations (1978)	Exposed (1979)	Platinum (1979)

Professional ratings
Review scores
Source	Rating
AllMusic	3/5 stars
Music Week	4/4 stars
Smash Hits	6/10

Exposed is the first live album by English musician Mike Oldfield, released as a double album on 27 July 1979 by Virgin Records in the UK. It was recorded at various locations across Europe during Oldfield's debut concert tour as a solo artist, following the release of his fourth studio album Incantations (1978). The album features Incantations and his debut album Tubular Bells (1973), plus Oldfield's 1979 non-album single "Guilty" as the encore.

Exposed was initially marketed as a restricted release with just 100,000 copies produced, but strong sales prompted Virgin Records to give the album a full release. It peaked at No. 16 on the UK Albums Chart and earned a silver certification from the British Phonographic Industry for selling 60,000 copies. A concert film of the shows at the Wembley Conference Centre during the 1979 tour were released on DVD in October 2005, also entitled Exposed.

== Background and recording ==
After undergoing Erhard Seminars Training in 1978, the formerly reclusive Mike Oldfield launched a Europe-wide tour with instrumental and choral ensemble to promote his fourth solo album, Incantations.

Initially during the tour the concerts were being recorded without the knowledge of the musicians, so that they could be paid less money, for just a performance and not a recording. The musicians found out, but the recordings went ahead and the album was produced.

The artwork is linked to the title, as it shows a frame of film containing a photo of Oldfield in a concert arena. Among the choir singers were members of the Queen's College, London choir. The all-female choir singers were selected strictly based on their looks.

Due primarily to costs associated with the numerous support singers and musicians, the tour made a net loss of half a million pounds.

The album was recorded using The Manor Studio's Mobile unit, and mixed at The Town House, London. The double vinyl album was released in 4 channel quadraphonic sound using the SQ Quadraphonic encoding system. This was one of the last quadraphonic albums released.

== Reissues ==
Exposed has been reissued a number of times including a HDCD reissue by Virgin Records in 2000.A double CD version was later released. A DVD version of the concert, recorded at Wembley Conference Centre, was released in 2005.

As of November 2016 the album has not been reissued on CD or digitally by Mercury Records. However, other reissued albums include different live recordings from the same period as Exposed. This comes as part of a deal in which Oldfield's Virgin albums were transferred to Universal's label. With the exception of this record and The Orchestral Tubular Bells, all Oldfield's 1970s albums have been reissued by Mercury Records on CD.

A reissue of Exposed by Universal Music Group on heavyweight vinyl was announced for release on 2 December 2016 on the same day as a vinyl reissue of the Collaborations disc from Oldfield's Boxed compilation.

== Track listing ==
=== Side one ===
1. "Incantations (Parts 1 & 2)" (Mike Oldfield) – 26:30

=== Side two ===
1. "Incantations (Parts 3 & 4)" (Mike Oldfield) – 20:50

=== Side three ===
1. "Tubular Bells (Part 1)" (Mike Oldfield) – 28:36

=== Side four ===
1. "Tubular Bells (Part 2)" (Mike Oldfield, except "The Sailor's Hornpipe") – 11:09
2. "Guilty" (Mike Oldfield) – 6:22

== Personnel ==
- Mike Oldfield – guitars, producer
- Nico Ramsden – guitars
- Phil Beer – guitar, vocals
- Pekka Pohjola – bass guitar
- Pierre Moerlen – drums, percussion
- Mike Frye – percussion
- Benoit Moerlen – percussion
- David Bedford – percussion, string arrangements
- Ringo McDonough – bodhrán
- Pete Lemer – keyboards
- Tim Cross – keyboards
- Maddy Prior – vocals
- Ray Gay – trumpets
- Ralph Izen – trumpets
- Simo Salminen – trumpets
- Colin Moore – trumpets
- Sebastian Bell – flutes
- Chris Nicholls – flutes
- Orchestral Leader - Richard Studt - violin
- Benedict Cruft - violin
- Elizabeth Edwards - violin
- Jane Price - violin
- Nichola Hurton - violin
- Jonathan Kahan - violin
- Donald McVay – viola
- Pauline Mack – viola
- Danny Daggers – viola
- Melinda Daggers – viola
- Liz Butler – viola
- Ross Cohen – violins
- Nigel Warren-Green – Cello
- Vanessa Park – cello
- David Bucknall – cello
- Jessica Ford – cello
- Nick Worters – bass
- Joe Kirby – bass
- Debra Bronstein – choir
- Marigo Acheson – choir
- Emma Freud – choir
- Diana Coulson – choir
- Mary Elliott – choir
- Mary Creed – choir
- Cecily Hazell – choir
- Wendy Lampitt – choir
- Clara Harris – choir
- Emma Smith – choir
- Catherine Loewe – choir
- Philp R. Newell – executive recording supervisor, producer
- Alan Perkins – recording engineer
- Greg Shriver – recording engineer
- Kurt Munkacsi – recording engineer
- Ken Capper – assistant
- Chris Blake – assistant
- Sally Arnold – tour co-ordinator

== Charts ==
Chart (1979)	Position
German Albums (Offizielle Top 100)	43
UK Albums (Official Charts)	16
