= Platinum (Mike Oldfield album) =

Studio album by Mike Oldfield
- Released: 23 November 1979
- Recorded: 1979
- Studios: Blue Rock, New York City; Electric Lady, New York City; Througham Slad Manor, Bisley, Surrey; The Manor, Oxfordshire
- Genres: Progressive rock, dance-rock, Pop rock
- Length: 37:35
- Label: Virgin
- Producer: Tom Newman

Mike Oldfield chronology
Exposed (1979)	Platinum (1979)	QE2 (1980)

Singles from Platinum
- 1. "Blue Peter"includes "Woodhenge" Released: 30 November 1979

Platinum is the fifth studio album by English multi-instrumentalist and songwriter Mike Oldfield, released on 23 November 1979 on Virgin Records. It was Oldfield's first album to include shorter songs and music written by others. A modified version of the album was released in the United States and Canada and titled Airborn.

The In Concert 1980 tour, which ran from April to December of that year, was in promotion of the album. In Germany the album peaked at number 11. The album has since been reissued with bonus material.

== Songs ==
=== Side one ===
The first side contains the 19-minute title track that is divided into four parts: "Airborne", "Platinum", "Charleston", and "North Star/Platinum Finale". The first two sections rely on melody played mostly with electric guitar; the first is slow in tempo and has many changes, while the second introduces a simple groove rhythm and a more repetitive song structure. "Airborne" was the theme tune for the 1980s BBC children's quiz show First Class. "Charleston" is a humorous piece with a simple rhythm and swinging melody that features a horn section. A female vocalist adds wordless vocals while Oldfield contributes some scat vocals in a whispering voice. "North Star/Platinum Finale" includes an excerpt from the 1977 Philip Glass composition "North Star". The lead melody is not borrowed from Glass but the choir's part is. The constant bass drum beat and octave-jumping bass line start the section and guitar enters with the melody later. A funky guitar riff and chorus appear, and the lead guitar continues to play the melody over them. Engineer Kurt Munkacsi was a frequent collaborator with Glass.

=== Side two ===
"Woodhenge" is an instrumental track named after the Neolithic monument located close to Stonehenge. On Airborn, the alternate version of Platinum only released in North America, the track was replaced by the track "Guilty".

=== "Sally"/"Into Wonderland" ===
"Sally" is a song written and sung by Oldfield and Nico Ramsden as a tribute to Sally Cooper, Oldfield's girlfriend at the time, who plays the tubular bells on the album. Shortly after the album's release, "Sally" was replaced with a different track, "Into Wonderland", sung by Wendy Roberts. The earliest pressings of the LP and cassette still show "Sally" in the track listing on the label and the sleeve even when the record had the new song. Later copies and subsequent reissues of Platinum correctly list "Into Wonderland".

Part of the song survives on the second version of the album, as the first 50 seconds of "Punkadiddle" is actually the last part of "Sally". This fast part, with the same melody of the song's chorus, served as a musical bridge to "Punkadiddle", so it was kept. "Sally" can often be found as part of bootleg issues.

Oldfield wrote "Punkadiddle" as a parody on punk rock. On stage, he and his band performed the song bare-chested.

"I Got Rhythm" is a cover version of the song by George and Ira Gershwin, featuring Oldfield's arrangement from the jaunty original into a Broadway-style ballad with harmonised vocals from Roberts and orchestration, mostly performed on keyboards.

== Critical reception ==
Professional ratings
Review scores
Source	Rating
AllMusic	3/5 stars
Smash Hits	7/10

The Globe and Mail called the songs "a logical extension of the Tubular Bells-type material, generally a consecutive layering of synthesizers, guitars and percussive effects, but taken at a quicker clip than one might have expected." The Boston Globe wrote that Oldfield "shows his increasing adeptness at orchestration."

== Track listing ==
Side one

1. "Platinum Part One: Airborne" – 5:05
2. "Platinum Part Two: Platinum" – 6:06
3. "Platinum Part Three: Charleston" – 3:17
4. "Platinum Part Four: North Star/Platinum Finale" – 4:49

Side two

1. "Woodhenge" – 4:05
2. "Into Wonderland" (originally "Sally") – 3:46
3. "Punkadiddle" – 5:46
4. "I Got Rhythm" – 4:44

== Airborn ==
Airborn album cover, released in North America.

Airborn is an alternate version of the Platinum album by Mike Oldfield released in North America in 1980. It is identical except that "Woodhenge" is replaced by "Guilty", a fast-paced live track based on a theme from Incantations. Certain tracks appear to be pressed at arbitrarily higher speeds than on the original pressing of Platinum and the track Platinum Part Two: Platinum is edited down by a minute (certain parts were cut out from the original track), so it only runs 5:04 on Airborn instead of 6:06. The artwork depicts a triangular shape formed from sections of tubular bell overlaid on a landscape of what appears to be a coastline and mountain range.

=== Track listing ===
==== Single LP ====
Side one

1. "Platinum Part One: Airborne" – 4:59
2. "Platinum Part Two: Platinum" – 4:36
3. "Platinum Part Three: Charleston" – 3:11
4. "Platinum Part Four: North Star/Platinum Finale" – 4:36

Side two

1. "Guilty" – 3:48
2. "Into Wonderland" – 3:36
3. "Punkadiddle" – 5:39
4. "I Got Rhythm" – 4:35

==== Double LP version ====
There is also a double LP release, with one LP being a version of Platinum (as above), the other having an alternate live version of Tubular Bells side one from the same tour that produced Exposed, and a mix of studio and live elements of Incantations and Tubular Bells side 2. This also came out in on cassette in 1980 as a Limited Edition Double Play Tape.

Side three

1. "Tubular Bells (Part 1)" (Live) (European Tour March–April 1979) – 23:40

Side four

1. "Incantations" (Studio & live) (European Tour March–April 1979) – 19:26

== Reissue ==
The album was re-released by Mercury Records on 30 July 2012, again with "Into Wonderland" replacing "Sally". This came as part of a deal in which Oldfield's Virgin albums were transferred to the label. It was released on the same day as QE2 and a year after the last Universal reissue of Incantations. The first disc is the original recording remastered with bonus material, and the second disc (available in the deluxe edition) is a live concert recorded during the two concerts at the Wembley Arena, London as part of the In Concert 1980 tour.

The reissue charted at 100 on the UK Albums Chart on 5 August 2012.

Disc 1

1. "Platinum {Part One}: Airborne" (2012 remaster) 5:06
2. "Platinum {Part Two}: Platinum" (2012 remaster) 6:06
3. "Platinum {Part Three}: Charleston" (2012 remaster) 3:17
4. "Platinum {Part Four}: North Star/Platinum Finale" (2012 remaster) 4:44
5. "Woodhenge" (2012 remaster) 4:05
6. "Into Wonderland" (2012 remaster) 3:46
7. "Punkadiddle" (2012 remaster) 5:46
8. "I Got Rhythm" (2012 remaster) 4:50
9. "Platinum" (Live studio session) 5:12
10. "North Star" (2012 stereo mix) 8:07
11. "Blue Peter" 2:06

Disc 2 – Live at Wembley Arena, May 1980

1. "Platinum" 20:43
2. "Punkadiddle" 5:17
3. "I Got Rhythm" 4:59
4. "Polka" 3:42
5. "Incantations" 22:14
6. "Tubular Bells {Part Two}" 8:53
7. "Guilty/Tubular Bells {Part One} Finale" 5:45
8. "Blue Peter/Portsmouth" 3:38
9. "William Tell" 2:27

== Instruments and recording ==
Synthesizers that appear on the album include a Roland SH-2000 and Sequential Circuits Prophet 5.

When Oldfield was in New York City recording Platinum and "Guilty" he recorded a disco arrangement of his first album, Tubular Bells, but he decided not to release it. Oldfield has not said whether this version still exists or whether it will ever see release. A version of Free's "All Right Now" was also recorded during these sessions. It was used as the theme for a television music programme also called Alright Now. The vocals are by Wendy Roberts, while Pierre Moerlen and Tom Newman also contributed.

The album was recorded at Electric Lady and Blue Rock in the United States, and in Througham, Denham, and The Manor in the UK. The album was mixed at AIR Studios in London.

== Personnel ==
- Mike Oldfield – acoustic and electric guitars, marimba, piano, synthesizers, vibraphone and vocals
- Francisco Centeno – bass guitar
- Hansford Rowe – bass
- Neil Jason – bass
- Nico Ramsden – keyboards
- Peter Lemer – keyboards
- Sally Cooper – tubular bells
- Demelza – congas (credited as "Demalza")
- Pierre Moerlen – drums and vibraphone (credited as "Pierre Moerlin")
- Morris Pert – drums (credited as "Maurice Pert")
- Allan Schwartzberg – drums
- David Bedford – vocal arrangements
- Wendy Roberts – vocals on Wonderland and I Got Rhythm
- Peter Gordon – horn arrangements
- Michael Riesman – horn arrangements

=== Technical staff ===
- Kurt Munkacsi – engineer
- Tom Newman – producer and engineer
- Richard Manwaring – assistant engineer
- Renate Blauel – assistant engineer

== Covers and remixes ==
Röyksopp adapted and remixed two sections of Platinum – "Platinum Part Three" and "Platinum Part Four", the latter retitled "Meatball" – on Back to Mine: Röyksopp.

== Charts ==
It spent 6 weeks on the Norwegian charts, peaking at No. 24, and also peaked at No. 24 on the UK Albums Chart.

=== Weekly charts ===
Chart (1979–2012)	Peak position
Austrian Albums (Ö3 Austria)	17
Belgian Albums (Ultratop Wallonia)	144
German Albums (Offizielle Top 100)	11
Norwegian Albums (VG-lista)	24
Spain (PROMUSICAE)	27
UK Albums (Official Charts)	24

=== Year-end charts ===
Chart (1980)	Position
German Albums (Offizielle Top 100)	11
Chart (1981)	Position
German Albums (Offizielle Top 100)	34

== Certifications ==
Region	Certification	Certified units/sales
Germany (BVMI)	Gold	250,000^{^}
Spain (Promusicae)	Platinum	100,000^{^}
United Kingdom (BPI)	Gold	100,000^{^}
^{^} Shipments figures based on certification alone.
