= Tubular Bells for Two =

- Origin: Blue Mountains, NSW, Australia Show created by: Daniel Holdsworth; Aidan Roberts; Music by Mike Oldfield
- Genres: Progressive rock, folk, Celtic
- Years active: 2008–present
- Labels: Glynis Henderson Productions places+spaces, inc.
- Members: Daniel Holdsworth; Tom Bamford
- Past members: Aidan Roberts
- Website: www.tubularbellsfortwo.com tubularbellsfortwo.co.uk

Tubular Bells for Two is a music-theatre production created and performed by Australian multi-instrumentalists Aidan Roberts and Daniel Holdsworth. In the show, the two musicians re-create Mike Oldfield's 1973 album Tubular Bells live with over twenty instruments. They won the Sydney Fringe award for the "Best Musical Moment" in 2010, and have since featured at major arts festivals around Australia and the Pacific, including Sydney Festival and NZ International Arts Festival. The production made its European début at the 2012 Edinburgh Festival Fringe, where it won two awards, going on to tour Europe in 2013 for the 40th anniversary of the original Oldfield album. The production has gone on to regularly tour the US, Europe, Australia and New Zealand.

In July 2017, it was announced that Aidan Roberts would be stepping down from touring the show, and a new member, Tom Bamford, would join the production. Bamford has since toured the UK and Australia, receiving high praise after stepping in to such a demanding role.

== History ==
Long-time friends and collaborators, Roberts and Holdsworth, conceived the show 'almost by accident' whilst listening to records around a fire during the Australian winter of 2008. After listening to the original Oldfield classic, the two decided to try to play the album from start to finish on two guitars. According to Michael Dwyer, "[p]erforming the album was furthest from their minds. But week by week, as Roberts' living room slowly filled to bursting with dozens of instruments, the bells of destiny became impossible to ignore." Eventually they were attempting to re-create Tubular Bells note for note on over twenty instruments between the two of them, and finally, after 9 months of rehearsal, they decided to perform it.

The duo contacted The Clarendon in Katoomba NSW, Australia, and asked for a 'quiet night', because they did not think the performance would have much appeal. They were given the night of Good Friday, 2009, and to their surprise the show sold out. This led to an invitation to the Sydney Fringe Festival in 2010, where the show received a Sydney Fringe Award for Best Musical Moment.

The pair have since gone on to perform sell-out seasons at the Victorian Arts Centre in 2011, Darwin Festival 2011, Sydney Festival 2012 and the New Zealand International Arts Festival 2012.

Tubular Bells for Two was performed at the 2012 Edinburgh Festival Fringe where the show won a Herald Angel Award and a Sixth Star Bobby Award.

During 2013 the show toured Australia, New Zealand and Europe to commemorate the 40th anniversary of the original Oldfield album. In 2014 there was an extensive tour of The Netherlands, and in 2015 it toured the US, Iceland and parts of Australia.

At the Adelaide Fringe in 2015, the show was garnered with two awards, winning a Weekly Award, and the BankSA Adelaide Fringe Award for Best Music.

In 2023 they announced their final tour of Australia in celebration of the 50th anniversary of Tubular Bells.

== DVD ==
A performance of Tubular Bells for Two was filmed during the Sydney Festival 2012 at the Parramatta Riverside Theatres. The film was directed and edited by Daniel Jameison, and was released on DVD in July 2012 through Birdland Records.

== Awards ==
Year	Award	Category
2015	Adelaide Fringe Award	BankSA Best Music Award
2015	Weekly Award	Best Music, Adelaide Fringe
2012	Broadway Baby Bobby Award	Sixth-Star Award, Edinburgh Fringe
2012	Bank of Scotland Herald Angel Award	Music, Edinburgh Fringe
2010	Sydney Fringe Award	Best Musical Moment

== Instruments and equipment ==
The following is a list of instruments and equipment used by the performers in the show:

=== Daniel Holdsworth ===
- Fender Thinline Telecaster electric guitar
- Gibson SG electric guitar
- Alhambra classical guitar
- Roland SH-201 synthesizer
- Piano
- Glockenspiel
- Drum kit
- Vocals
- Tin Whistle
- Kazoo
- Nord Electro organ
- Hofner bass guitar
- Line 6 M13 looper
- Boss DS-1 distortion pedal
- Boss PH-3 phaser pedal
- Artec Blues Overdrive pedal
- Artec Analog Delay pedal
- iPad with Audio Sampler
- 2 x Fender Hot Rod DeVille amplifiers
- Tubular bells

=== Aidan Roberts / Tom Bamford ===
- Fender Jazzmaster electric guitar
- Piano
- Nord Electro organ
- Epiphone acoustic guitar
- Hofner bass guitar
- Glockenspiel
- Drum kit
- Bodhran
- Vocals
- Kazoo
- Line 6 M13 looper
- Boss OC-3 Super Octave pedal
- Ibanez Tube Screamer pedal
- 2 x Fender Hot Rod DeVille amplifiers
- Tubular bells
