= Daniel Holdsworth (musician) =

Australian musician and composer (born 1981)

- Born: 22 May 1981 (age 44)
- Origin: Blue Mountains, NSW, Australia
- Genres: Rock, alternative, folk, classical
- Instrument(s): Guitar, piano, organ, bass, drums, mandolin, ukulele, harmonica, vocals
- Website: danielholdsworth.com

Daniel Holdsworth is an Australian musician and composer. He is a co-creator of the music-theatre production, Tubular Bells for Two, releases music as a solo artist, and has performed in bands such as Darks Common Underground, The Maple Trail and The Saturns. He has also composed music for film, television, theatre and dance.

== Biography ==
Daniel Holdsworth was born on 22 May 1981, in Penrith NSW, Australia, and has lived most of his life in the Blue Mountains. He began playing music at a young age and attended Blaxland High School where he was heavily involved in school productions and other music programs, performing several times at the Sydney Opera House. During this period he also began formal training as a classical guitarist.

At the age of fifteen, Daniel began professional work within the music industry as a session musician, notably recording with Yothu Yindi for the closing ceremony of the 1996 Atlanta paralympics, and singing a duet for the same ceremony composed by Garry Hardman from Australian Screen Music.

After high school, Holdsworth attended the University of Western Sydney where he studied with Bruce Crossman as a post-graduate in composition and music technology. During his university years he worked as a music teacher in the Blue Mountains, whilst also playing in many bands. His main focus was as singer/songwriter/guitarist of the award-winning rock band, The Saturns, who released several recordings and toured Australia extensively between 2005 and 2008. He recorded and toured with other bands, including The Maple Trail. During this period Daniel began composing music for theatre and dance productions, leading to a position as musical director and performer in William Yang's My Generation, which was commissioned for the opening of the National Portrait Gallery (Australia) in Canberra in 2008.

In 2009, Holdsworth premiered a music-theatre collaboration with Aidan Roberts, Tubular Bells for Two. The production involves the two musicians recreating Mike Oldfield's 1973 album, Tubular Bells, with over twenty instruments. Roberts and Holdsworth received a Sydney Fringe Award for 'Best Musical Moment' in the Sydney Fringe Festival 2010. The duo have since gone on to tour the show internationally, winning a Herald Angel Award and a Sixth Star Bobby Award at the Edinburgh Fringe 2012, a Weekly Award and BankSA Best Music Award at the Adelaide Fringe 2015.

In 2013 Daniel composed the music for the feature film, William Yang: My Generation which premiered at the Sydney Film Festival.

In 2015 Holdsworth formed a new group, Darks Common Underground, working on his first original material as a songwriter since the Saturns broke up in 2010. The band released their debut self-titled album in 2020.

In 2024 Holdsworth started releasing new music as a solo artist.

== Awards ==
Year	Award	Category	For
2015	Adelaide Fringe Award	BankSA Best Music Award	Tubular Bells for Two
2015	Weekly Award	Adelaide Fringe Best Music Category	Tubular Bells for Two
2012	Broadway Baby Bobby Award	Sixth Star Award, Edinburgh Fringe	Tubular Bells for Two
2012	Bank of Scotland Herald Angel Award	Music, Edinburgh Fringe	Tubular Bells for Two
2010	Sydney Fringe Award	Best Musical Moment	Tubular Bells for Two
2006	Blue Mountains Music Award	Best Rock Song	The Saturns I Could Be The One

== Recordings ==
Year	Band/artist	Title	Label	Release	Role
2025	Daniel Holdsworth	The Storm	Independent	Single	Songwriter/producer/performer
2024	Daniel Holdsworth	Empty Rooms	Independent	Single	Songwriter/producer/performer
2024	Daniel Holdsworth	Morning Star	Independent	Single	Songwriter/producer/performer
2024	Daniel Holdsworth	Close Encounters	Independent	Single	Songwriter/producer/performer
2024	Daniel Holdsworth	Memory Dust	Independent	Single	Songwriter/producer/performer
2024	Daniel Holdsworth	The First Song On Spotify	Independent	Single	Songwriter/producer/performer
2023	The Absolutely Incredibly Amazing Penrith Band	Sam Delivers	Independent	Album	Songwriter, engineer, vocals, guitars, drums, keys, percussion, recorders
2020	Darks Common Underground	Darks Common Underground	Independent	Album	Songwriter, engineer, vocals, guitars, bouzouki, banjo, mandolin, organ
2019	Yeevs	Yeevs	Independent	Album	Producer, engineer
2017	Darks Common Underground	Meteorites and Other Things	Independent	Single	Songwriter, engineer, vocals, guitars, banjo, mandolin
2012	The Maple Trail	Cable Mount Warning	Broken Stone Records	Album	Drums, Guitar
2009	The Saturns	Sweet Distractions	Snare Music	Album	Songwriter, Vocals, Guitars, Piano, Bass, Synthesizers, Harmonica
2008	The Maple Trail	Dirty Echo Spark	Broken Stone Records	Album	Drums
2007	The Saturns	Here's The Saturns	Snare Music	EP	Songwriter, vocals, guitars
2003	T. Malfroy & The Guests	T. Malfroy & The Guests	Independent	EP	Engineer, bass guitar, vocals
2002	Snare	See You Somewhere	Thin Annoying Blokes	EP	Songwriter, engineer, vocals, guitars, bass, drums, keyboards
2001	Snare	Never See The Sun	Thin Annoying Blokes	EP	Songwriter, vocals, guitars, drums, bass, keyboards
1996	Yothu Yindi	World Turning: In Celebration of the Sydney 2000 Paralympic Games	Mushroom Records	Single	Vocals

== DVD ==
Year	Title	Label	Role
2012	Tubular Bells for Two Live at the Sydney Festival	Birdland Records	Performer

== Theatre ==
Year	Production	Producer	Role
2009–2023	Tubular Bells for Two	Shortwalk / Craft Music / The Leighton Pope Organisation	Co-creator and performer
2009–10	Hansel and Gretel	The Acting Factory	Narrator and Musical Director
2008–10	William Yang's My Generation	Performing Lines	Musical Director and performer

== Film ==
Year	Film title	Type	Director	Role
2013	William Yang: My Generation	Feature	William Yang	Composer
2003	Home: Refugio TX	Feature-Documentary	Anne-Marrie Hess	Assistant composer to Andree Greenwell with Tim Malfory

== Television ==
Year	Program	Producer	Network	Director	Role
2013	William Yang: My Generation	Felix Media	ABC	William Yang	Composer
