= Incantations (album) =

Studio album by Mike Oldfield
- Released: 1 December 1978
- Recorded: December 1977–September 1978
- Studio: Througham Slad Manor, Bisley, England
- Genre: Progressive rock, new-age, postminimalist
- Length: 72:44
- Label: Virgin
- Producer: Mike Oldfield

Mike Oldfield chronology
Boxed (1976)	Incantations (1978)	Exposed (1979)

Incantations is the fourth studio album by English musician, songwriter, and producer Mike Oldfield, released on 1 December 1978 by Virgin Records. Following the release of his previous album Ommadawn (1975), Oldfield moved into a new home in Bisley, Gloucestershire, where he set up a new recording studio. He started on a follow-up in 1977 which took form as a double album with one, side-long track on each side of the LP record. Oldfield wished to use real incantations in the music, but ended up using folklore as a loose running theme, such as Diana the Huntress. Though primarily instrumental, lyrical sections are adapted from works by poets Henry Longfellow and Ben Jonson. Oldfield completed the self-awareness seminar Exegesis while recording Incantations.

Incantations peaked at No. 14 on the UK Albums Chart, becoming Oldfield's first album not to reach the UK top-five. It was supported by Oldfield's first concert tour as a solo artist, which featured all four parts of Incantations performed on stage with a band, orchestra, and choir. Parts of this tour were recorded and released as the 1979 live album Exposed. Incantations was reissued in 2000 and 2011; the latter release features a new digital remaster and additional content, including Oldfield's 1979 disco-influenced non-album single "Guilty" and footage from Exposed.

== Background and writing ==
By the end of 1975 Oldfield had released his third album, Ommadawn (1975), which, like his previous two albums, Tubular Bells (1973) and Hergest Ridge (1974), had reached the top-five of the UK Albums Chart and helped to solidify Oldfield's popularity as a musician. The three albums were similar in structure, formed of a single composition split into two parts of the LP record. The release of Ommadawn marked the end of Oldfield's time at his home near Kington, Herefordshire, from which he moved to Througham Slad Manor near Bisley, Gloucestershire and set up a recording studio there.

When work on Incantations began, Oldfield recalled that his initial goal was a record that contained "real incantations to exert a benign magical influence on anybody who heard it". He intended to base the music around real spells and chants, and asked the A&R department of his label, Virgin Records, to invite the head Druid to his home and discuss it further. The visit was unsuccessful; Oldfield's request for magic spells was turned down and he got the impression that the person was more interested in converting him to the movement. Keith Critchlow then introduced Oldfield to various "strange people" to gain inspiration, including poet Kathleen Raine, whose poems failed to conjure strong enough music, and a "shaman, gypsy-type woman" who remained silent all through her meeting with Oldfield. Then, a Virgin employee researched into British folklore and suggested Gog and Magog, from which Oldfield was able to find incantations that worked, specifically about Diana the Huntress, which he then used as a running theme through the album.

Oldfield had been listening to a greater amount of religious music than before, which he credited to keep him "calm and sane" as he described himself as "very disturbed" during this time. He also examined the styles of music of his previous albums; rock with a classical music format on his debut Tubular Bells, Celtic music on Hergest Ridge, and "more African" styles on Ommadawn. For Incantations, Oldfield wanted to present "some magical things", which influenced his decision to use a string section and flute. The album marked Oldfield's first attempt with a string section and he wrote the orchestral arrangements himself. He hired the group of around eighteen musicians to play in his studio. After some early cuts were produced, Oldfield started work on a more complicated sequence which featured various time signatures and every key on a music scale, which reminded him of the nursery rhyme "Frère Jacques". It developed into the double vibraphone section on "Incantations (Part Four)". This section was one that Oldfield described as "the closest I've ever come to self-expression" and deemed it, along with the electric guitar solo that follows it and a flute solo elsewhere, as the most important part of the album.

In its final form, Incantations took shape as a double album and separated into four distinct parts, each one taking up one side of an LP record. Oldfield had felt guilty that he had not released new material in three years, which influenced him to make a double. Oldfield named composer and electronic musician Terry Riley as a big influence on Incantations, particularly his use of ostinato. At 72 minutes in total length, Incantations remained Oldfield's longest album until his 2005 double album, Light + Shade.

== Recording ==
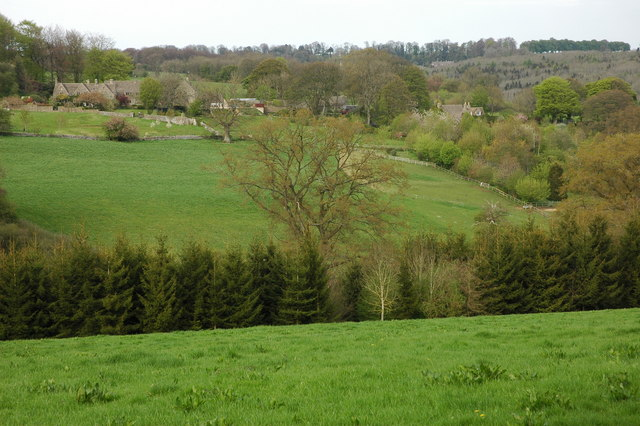
Througham Slad Manor, where the album was recorded

Incantations was recorded at Througham Slad between December 1977 and September 1978, during which Oldfield faced professional and personal difficulties. After some 20 minutes of music was recorded, staff at Virgin Records asked Oldfield to hear what had been done. Oldfield recalled that one day, "a delegation arrived at my house", including label founder Richard Branson. Upon hearing the music, and telling the staff that Incantations was to be a double album with what Oldfield called a "mathematical and classical-sounding" piece, Oldfield wrote: "They quietly sat around the place listening; at the end, Richard was his usual cheerful self but everyone else filed out in silence". Oldfield theorised that the incident helped to convince Virgin management to switch from being a predominantly progressive rock label and to begin supporting punk bands, who were becoming popular. In addition to the lack of support from his label, Oldfield became a target in the music press as being outdated and no longer in fashion. These events drained Oldfield's inspiration and enthusiasm for Incantations and recording slowed. He started to drink heavily, becoming more aggressive and withdrawn which ended his relationship with Critchlow's daughter Louise. He looked back on this time as when life was "really at rock bottom".

In June 1978, after a road trip to Italy and Greece with his brother and time at home with his father had failed to help his situation, Oldfield was recommended to attend an Exegesis seminar by the wife of his studio engineer. After the three-day assertiveness course Oldfield said he felt "nothing but absolute relief and euphoria".

Along with some other pieces of Oldfield's work, a different version of "Part Four" was used for the soundtrack of Tony Palmer's The Space Movie.

== Content ==
Oldfield based the musical ideas he had for Incantations on the circle of fifths, which demonstrates the relationship among the twelve pitches of the chromatic scale, their corresponding key signatures, and the associated major and minor keys.

When the CD version was released, early pressings unnecessarily have "Part Three" shortened from 16:59 to 13:49 by cutting the beginning. When 80-minute CDs became the norm and quality control was increased, the full cut of "Part Three" was restored. All modern pressings have the full version of the track.

Parts one, two, and four of the composition feature lyrics; part three is instrumental. The lyrics to part one repeat the name of three Roman goddesses: Diana, Luna, and Lucina. The second half of part two features chapters 22 and 12 (in that order) of the 1855 epic poem The Song of Hiawatha by American poet Henry Wadsworth Longfellow. The lyrics in part four are from "Ode to Cynthia" from the satirical stage play Cynthia's Revels by Ben Jonson.

== Artwork ==
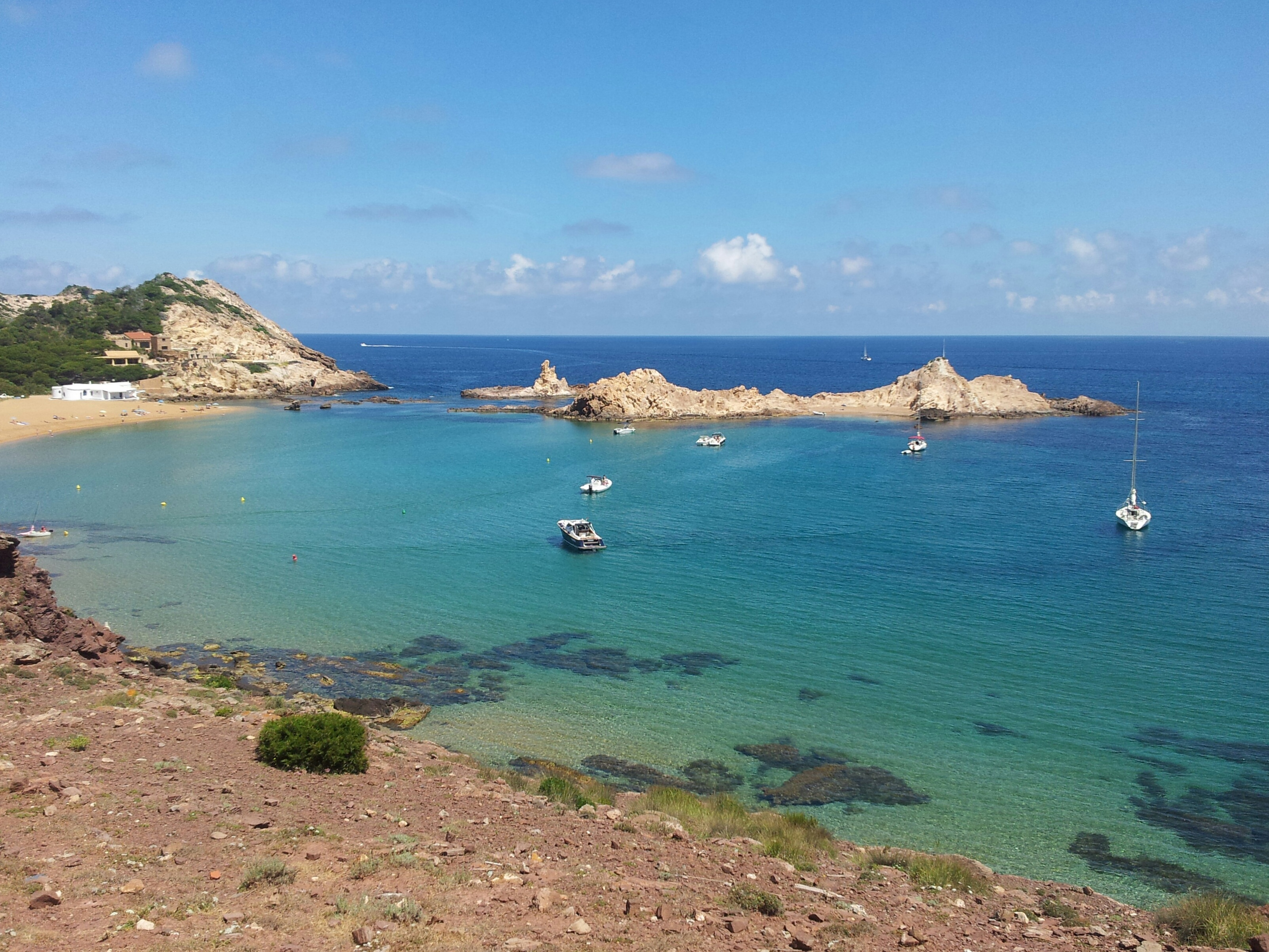
Cala Pregonda

The album's cover was designed by photographer and artist Trevor Key, who had also designed the sleeves for Tubular Bells and Hergest Ridge. The front photograph was taken at Cala Pregonda beach on the Spanish island of Menorca. It is unclear whether Oldfield was actually on the beach at the time it was taken, though it is possible from looking at other photographs from the shoot. It is assumed that Key cut and pasted the image of Oldfield onto a slightly different background for artistic reasons. Early pressings of the LP included a poster showing a subtly different photograph from the one used on the cover. The 2011 reissue of the album was given new artwork, showing a new photograph of the same rock formation depicted in the background of the original, but no image of Oldfield.

== Release and reception ==
Professional ratings
Review scores
Source	Rating
AllMusic	3/5 stars

Incantations was released in the UK on 1 December 1978. It received a strong initial commercial response, reaching platinum certification by the British Phonographic Industry two weeks prior after receiving over 300,000 preorders. It peaked at No. 14 on the UK Albums Chart. The album was promoted with the release of "Guilty", a non-album track that was released in April 1979 with the four-minute "Excerpt from Incantations" on the B-side. The single reached No. 22 on the UK Singles Chart.

The Boston Globe noted that "the string arrangements are the most tasteful Oldfield has ever written... Unfortunately, he still has a tendency to dwell on simple ideas".

== Reissues ==
Incantations was first issued on CD in 1985 by Virgin Records. This release features a cut version of "Incantations (Part Three)" for a running time of 13:49. A CD reissue from 1988 included the complete track. A remaster completed by Simon Heyworth was released on HDCD in 2000 with updated inner sleeve artwork and a short essay by Dave Laing.

In July 2011, Incantations was reissued by Mercury Records in standard and Deluxe CDs and limited edition vinyl signed by Oldfield. It also contains new cover artwork and a 16-page booklet with an essay. The standard edition contains a remastered stereo mix of the album with "Guilty" as a bonus track. The Deluxe package contains material from the standard edition, an extra CD of singles and previously unreleased tracks from the album's sessions, and a DVD with a 5.1 surround sound mix of some of the latter tracks, promotional videos, and live footage of Incantations from 1979 originally released on the Exposed video. The 2011 reissue does not contain the album in 5.1 surround sound, as the original multi-track tapes had either badly deteriorated or been lost. The 2011 reissue went to No. 70 in the UK.

== Track listing ==
All music by Mike Oldfield. Lyrics on "Incantations (Part Two)" by Longfellow and "Incantations (Part Four)" by Ben Jonson.

Side one
No.	Title	Length
1.	"Incantations (Part One)"	19:08

Side two
No.	Title	Length
1.	"Incantations (Part Two)"	19:36

Side three
No.	Title	Length
1.	"Incantations (Part Three)"	16:58

Side four
No.	Title	Length
1.	"Incantations (Part Four)"	17:01

== Personnel ==
Musicians

- Mike Oldfield – various instruments (except below)
- Mike Laird – trumpet
- Pierre Moerlen – drums, vibraphone on "Incantations (Part Four)"
- Benoît Moerlen – vibraphone on "Incantations (Part Four)"
- Maddy Prior – vocals on "The Song of Hiawatha" on "Incantations (Part Two)" and "Ode to Cynthia" on "Incantations (Part Four)"
- Sally Oldfield – vocals
- Queen's College Girls Choir – vocals
- Sebastian Bell – flute
- Terry Oldfield – flute
- Jabula – African drums
- Orchestra
- David Bedford – strings and choir conductor

Production

- Mike Oldfield – production
- Paul Lindsay – engineer
- Trevor Key – cover artwork

== Charts ==
Chart (1978)	Peak position
Dutch Albums (Album Top 100)	27
German Albums (Offizielle Top 100)	41
New Zealand Albums (RMNZ)	19
Norwegian Albums (VG-lista)	14
Spain (PROMUSICAE)	5
Swedish Albums (Sverigetopplistan)	32
UK Albums (OCC)	14

Chart (2011)	Peak position
Scottish Albums (OCC)	83

Chart (2021)	Peak position
UK Rock & Metal Albums (OCC)	14

== Certifications ==
Region	Certification	Certified units/sales
United Kingdom (BPI)	Platinum	300,000^{^}
^{^} Shipments figures based on certification alone.
