= Guilty (Mike Oldfield song) =

Single by Mike Oldfield
- B-side: "Excerpt from Incantations"
- Released: 6 April 1979
- Recorded: New York City, New York
- Genre: Disco; europop
- Length: 4:00
- Label: Virgin Records
- Songwriter(s): Mike Oldfield
- Producer(s): Mike Oldfield

Mike Oldfield singles chronology
"Take Four" (1978)	"Guilty" (1979)	"Blue Peter" (1979)

"Guilty" is a single by English musician Mike Oldfield, released in 1979 on Virgin Records. It reached number 22 in the UK Singles Chart. It is notable for being Oldfield's first obvious attempt to capitalise on a current musical trend, in this case disco. The UK 12" edition was originally issued on pale blue vinyl.

== Recording ==
The composition came from Oldfield's desire to create an up-tempo tune based on a more interesting chord structure than was typical for disco music; it is built on the circle of fifths chord sequence previously used as the leitmotif of the musician's previous album Incantations. When Oldfield was in New York recording Platinum and "Guilty" he also recorded a disco arrangement of his first album, Tubular Bells, and a version of Free's "All Right Now".

== Music video ==
The music video for "Guilty" is in a colourful cartoon style. A promo video for "Guilty 2013" was released by earMusic, which features a shortened version of the "Guilty Electrofunk Mix" from the Oldfield/York remix album Tubular Beats. In 2011 Moist Creations had released a screenshot from this titled "Guilty 2011".

== Track listing ==
=== 7" single ===
1. "Guilty" Mike Oldfield – 4:00
2. "Excerpt from Incantations" Mike Oldfield – 4:10

=== 12" super giant 45 ===
1. "Guilty (Long version)" Mike Oldfield – 6:44
2. "Guilty" Mike Oldfield – 4:02

== Personnel ==
- Mike Oldfield - guitar, producer
- Kurt Munkacsi - engineer
- Roddy Hui - assistant engineer
- Chris Parker - drums
- Garry Guzio - horn
- Dana McCurdy - synthesiser
- David Tofani - sax
- Raymond L. Chew - piano
- Neil Jason - bass
- Steve Winwood - organ
- Iris Hiskey - vocals
- Patricia Deckert - vocals
- David Anchel - vocals
- Phil Gavin Smith - vocals
- Christa Peters - photography
- Cooke Key - sleeve

== Charts ==
Chart (1979)	Position
UK Singles (OCC)	22
