= Fender Hot Rod DeVille =

Guitar amplifier

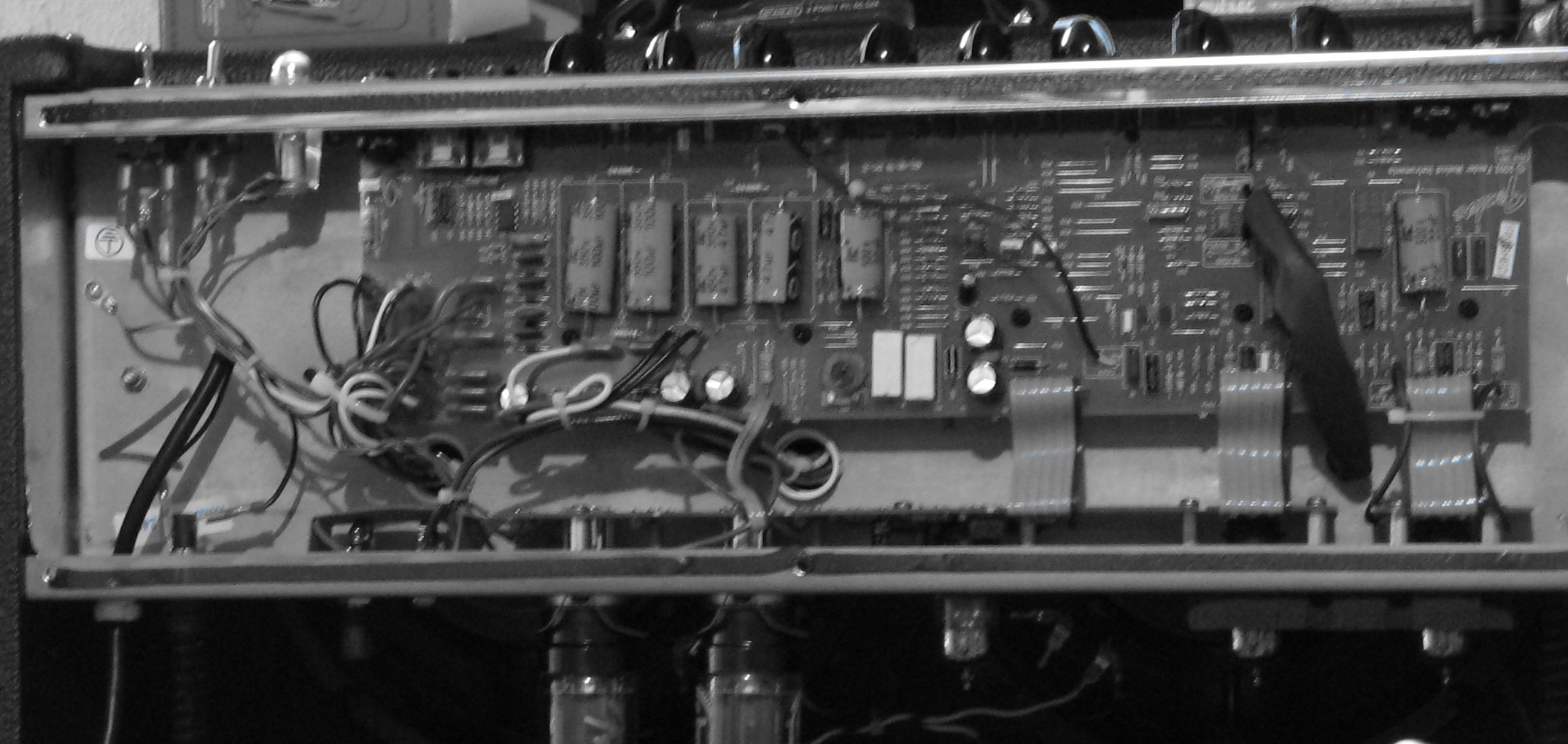
Interior of amplifier with back panel removed.

The Fender Hot Rod DeVille is a combo tube guitar amplifier manufactured and sold by Fender. It was introduced in 1996 as part of Fender's Hot Rod line of amplifiers, and since then has been in continuous production. The Hot Rod DeVille is a modified version of the earlier Fender Blues DeVille from the Blues amplifier line and has a higher level of gain in its preamplification signal. The DeVille incorporates a 60 watt amplifier and has been offered in two different models: a 212, with 2, 12-inch speakers and a 410, with 4, 10-inch speakers. The 410 utilized 10" Fender Special Design speakers made by Eminence and was available for versions II and III. The 212 has been available through versions II, III and IV. The 212 has offered the following speakers: 12" Fender Special Design by Eminence for version II, 12" Celestion G12-P80 for version III, and 12" Celestion A-Type for version IV. Fender described version III as incorporating modifications to the preamp to provide the drive channels with "more modern distortion," switching to Celestion speakers for the 212, and changing the control panel from chrome to black, for better visibility on stage. Fender described version IV as incorporating modifications to the preamp to provide the drive channels with "better definition of the notes," changing the type of Celestion speaker, and modifying the reverb unit to provide "smoother" and more controllable reverb. The DeVille is the sister amplifier of the Fender Hot Rod Deluxe.

== Specifications ==
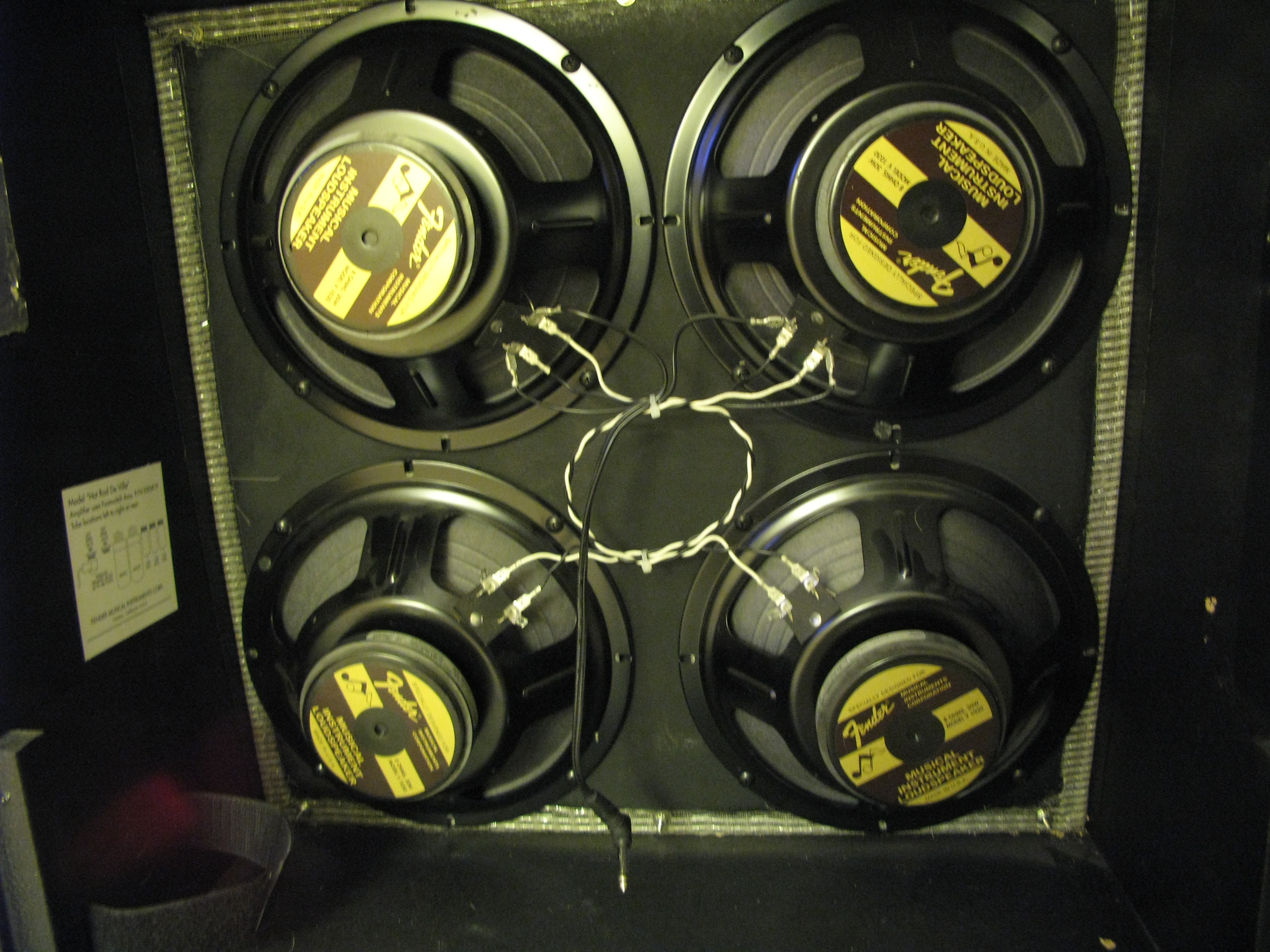
Interior of a 410 speaker cabinet with amplifier and reverb removed.

Both the 212 and 410 feature three channels: normal, drive, and more drive. These channels are selectable via the "Channel Select" and "More Drive" buttons on either the control panel or footswitch (included), and they share EQ. Other features include a Bass, Middle, and Treble EQ, Master Volume, Presence, Normal/Bright switch, standby switch, preamp out and return for an effects loop configuration, and a Fender long-spring reverb (solid state for both the driver and the recovery circuits). An external speaker jack is located next to the output tubes in the back and allows the signal to be heard out of both the amplifier itself and the speakers to which it is connected (which must have a 4- or 8-Ohm impedance).

The DeVille features a 60-watt valve amplifier with three 12AX7 preamp valves and two 6L6 output valves. Its circuitry includes full PCB with valves and pots mounted directly to the circuit board. The 410 utilized 10" Fender Special Design speakers made by Eminence and was offered for versions II and III. The 212 has been available through versions II, III and IV. The 212 has offered the following speakers: 12" Fender Special Design by Eminence for version II, 12" Celestion G12-P80 for version III, and 12" Celestion A-Type for version IV. Both consume 180 watts of power. The 410 amp weighs about 50 lbs. and the 212 weighs about 55 lbs.

== See also ==
Fender Hot Rod Deluxe
