= The Space Movie =

1980 British film by Tony Palmer

- Theatrical release poster
- Directed by: Tony Palmer
- Written by: Tony Palmer
- Produced by: Richard Branson; Simon Draper
- Edited by: Graham Bunn
- Music by: Mike Oldfield
- Production company: Virgin Films
- Distributed by: International Harmony
- Release dates: 1980; February 26, 2007 (DVD)
- Running time: 78 minutes
- Countries: United Kingdom; United States
- Language: English

The Space Movie is a documentary film produced in 1979 by Tony Palmer at the request of NASA, to celebrate the tenth anniversary of the Apollo 11 Moon landing.

The 78 minute film was released theatrically in 1980, on VHS in 1983 and on DVD in 2007. Richard Branson and Simon Draper's Virgin Films produced the film. Ed Bishop provided some narration for the film. Filmink wrote "no one talks about this movie any more but it existed."

== Soundtrack ==
The music for The Space Movie was produced by the English multi-instrumentalist Mike Oldfield who was then signed to Virgin Records. The film included pieces from Oldfield's released works, including Tubular Bells and Hergest Ridge, Ommadawn and "Portsmouth".

It also featured excerpts from what was Oldfield's then-new album, Incantations. The film also made use of the orchestral arrangements of Oldfield's first two albums, The Orchestral Tubular Bells and notably The Orchestral Hergest Ridge, which has never been released. The Space Movie soundtrack was also intended to be released as an album.

A short section of The Space Movie featuring Incantations is available as bonus material on the 1993 video collection, Elements – The Best of Mike Oldfield.

== See also ==
- Apollo 11 in popular culture
