= The Orchestral Tubular Bells =

Live album by Mike Oldfield
- Released: January 1975
- Recorded: September 1974
- Studio: The Manor Mobile
- Genre: Progressive rock
- Length: 50:46
- Label: Virgin
- Producer: David Bedford, Mike Oldfield

Mike Oldfield chronology
Hergest Ridge (1974)	The Orchestral Tubular Bells (1975)	Ommadawn (1975)

Tubular Bells series chronology
Tubular Bells (1973)	The Orchestral Tubular Bells (1975)	Tubular Bells II (1992)

Professional ratings
Review scores
Source	Rating
Allmusic	4/5 stars

The Orchestral Tubular Bells is an orchestral version of Mike Oldfield's album Tubular Bells, arranged by David Bedford and recorded in 1974 by the Royal Philharmonic Orchestra, featuring Oldfield himself playing the guitar. Excerpts from the album were featured in the 1979 NASA film The Space Movie. It peaked at #17 on the UK Albums Chart in 1975.

In 2000 it was reissued by Virgin as a HDCD and is the only one of Oldfield's 1970s albums yet to be reissued by Mercury Records.

== Differences from the original Tubular Bells ==
The main difference between Tubular Bells and the orchestrated version is that Oldfield does not perform the majority of instruments himself; he only plays an overdubbed guitar. All of the melodies from Tubular Bells are the same, although transferred to different instruments. Vocal chords were not performed as vocals and there is no 'master of ceremonies' reading out the instruments at the end of part one.

In 1975 New Musical Express described the album as a logical extension of the piece. However, Oldfield was not happy with Bedford's orchestrated interpretation of his work, as he stated in his autobiography, Changeling.

== Recording ==
The Orchestral Tubular Bells was performed and recorded live at the Barking Town Hall in September 1974 by the Royal Philharmonic Orchestra. This was shown on a British television station, BBC Two, with Steve Hillage (of Gong) playing guitar. Oldfield later added his playing to the album by overdubbing his acoustic guitar at Worcester Cathedral.

The Orchestral Tubular Bells was not the only Mike Oldfield album that was orchestrated at the time; David Bedford also wrote the score for Oldfield's second album, Hergest Ridge. However, The Orchestral Hergest Ridge was never released to the public as an album. Excerpts from The Orchestral Hergest Ridge were featured in the 1979 NASA film The Space Movie.

== Album cover ==
The album artwork depicts the "bent bell tube" image from Tubular Bells, originally by Trevor Key, in a partly blue/grey box, surrounded by a black border. Some later releases from 2003 have had the bell on a yellow/orange skyscape.

== Live performances ==
Bedford's orchestration was performed by the BBC Concert Orchestra, conducted by Michael Seal and again featuring Steve Hillage, for a concert marking what would have been Bedford's 80th year. A recording was broadcast by BBC Radio 3 in November 2018.

== Track listing ==
All selections written and composed by Mike Oldfield.

=== Side one ===
1. "The Orchestral Tubular Bells, Part 1" – 26:32

=== Side two ===
1. "The Orchestral Tubular Bells, Part 2" – 24:29

== Charts ==
Chart (1975)	Position
UK Albums (OCC)	17
