= Hergest Ridge (album) =

Studio album by Mike Oldfield
- Released: 30 August 1974
- Recorded: Spring 1974
- Studios: The Manor, Shipton-on-Cherwell
- Genre: Progressive rock
- Length: 40:14
- Label: Virgin
- Producers: Mike Oldfield; Tom Newman

Mike Oldfield chronology
Tubular Bells (1973)	Hergest Ridge (1974)	The Orchestral Tubular Bells (1975)

Mercury Records 2010 reissue
- The revised aerial photograph artwork. The Deluxe Edition is shown.

Hergest Ridge is the second studio album by English musician and composer Mike Oldfield, released on 30 August 1974 by Virgin Records. The album followed the unexpected and overwhelming commercial success of his 1973 debut, Tubular Bells, which had thrust the reclusive twenty-year-old into the public spotlight. Seeking an escape from intense media pressure and panic attacks, Oldfield retreated to the English–Welsh border country, writing the new material at an isolated house known as The Beacon, situated near the Hergest Ridge hill in Herefordshire.

Like its predecessor, the album is an instrumental progressive rock work split across two side-long, multi-movement parts: "Part One" and "Part Two". It is characterised by its pastoral atmosphere and a complex, densely layered arrangement of electric guitars, synthesisers, organs, and traditional acoustic instrumentation including the oboe and flute. After early recording sessions in London and Oxfordshire were abandoned, the album was recorded between spring and early summer 1974 at The Manor in Oxfordshire, co-produced by Oldfield and Tom Newman.

Upon its release, Hergest Ridge was a major commercial success, debuting at number one on the UK Albums Chart. In a rare chart event, it held the top position for three consecutive weeks before being displaced by Tubular Bells, making Oldfield one of the few artists to replace themselves at the summit of the British charts. Though early contemporary critical reception was somewhat divided by inevitable comparisons to his debut, the album has since been praised retrospectively as a foundational work in Oldfield's career and a classic of acoustic progressive rock. The album was later reissued in 2010 featuring new stereo and 5.1 surround sound mixes alongside previously unreleased bonus material.

== Background ==
Following the release of his debut studio album, Tubular Bells (1973), Oldfield sought a secluded countryside location to compose its follow-up. In early 1974, he drove through the West Country before travelling north into Herefordshire. He eventually arrived in Kington, a small market town on the English–Welsh border situated in the shadow of Hergest Ridge. Drawn to the area by the 425-metre (1,394 ft) elongated hill, Oldfield decided to settle locally. He noticed a house named The Beacon, located on the edge of the adjacent Bradnor Hill, which was up for sale. After obtaining financial approval from Virgin Records co-owner Richard Branson, Oldfield purchased the property.

Although settled in his new home, Oldfield grew increasingly anxious regarding his career direction. Under his contract with Virgin, he received a basic weekly wage of £25, while the mounting pressure to make public appearances triggered severe panic attacks. Lacking concrete musical ideas for his next project, he chose to perform simple, undemanding medieval tunes alongside folk musician Les Penning at Penrhos Court, a local restaurant, in exchange for free wine. Spurred on by Branson to begin work on a successor to Tubular Bells, Oldfield finally commenced writing after Virgin delivered a Farfisa organ, a four-track TEAC tape machine, and a mixing desk to his residence.

== Recording ==
Initial recording sessions for the album began in February and March 1974 at Basing Street Studios in London and Chipping Norton Recording in Oxfordshire. Oldfield found both environments oppressive and unproductive, leading him to abandon the tapes entirely. Production recommenced in earnest during the spring of 1974 at The Manor near Shipton-on-Cherwell, Oxfordshire, where engineer Tom Newman returned to co-produce the album alongside Oldfield. The final tracks were mixed at AIR Studios on London's Oxford Street.

Oldfield later reflected that the musical arrangement was incredibly intricate, noting that many of the best sections were so densely layered and buried in the mix that they required a high-quality record player to be properly discerned. He remarked: "I have to listen really hard to pick out something that I know that I'm proud that I did." Though he was particularly satisfied with the album's climax, contemporary comparisons to Tubular Bells frustrated him, as he considered Hergest Ridge to be a far more meticulously arranged and fully conceived work. Looking back on the project in 1975, Oldfield maintained that whilst it contained excellent musical ideas, the recording schedule had been rushed, which ultimately compromised the final performance.

== Music ==
Similarly to Tubular Bells, the album is divided into two movements. Oldfield frequently superimposes layers of electric guitar recorded by first amplifying heavily (to achieve a sustained organ-like quality) and then reducing the volume greatly via use of the Glorfindel Box (a custom guitar effects unit housed in plywood, which was extremely unreliable in its operation; the unit was obtained from David Bedford, who had been given the box at a party by its creator). The volume was reduced further using the compression channel from the Manor's mixing console, as had been done on Tubular Bells Part 2. Textures are extended further using various organ timbres and the use of voice as an instrument (the voice is never treated prominently and is deliberately reduced as much as possible and thus permitted largely for textural effect).

== Versions ==
Hergest Ridge was remixed in SQ system 4-channel quadraphonic sound by Oldfield in 1976 for the 4-LP set Boxed. Following the creation of the remix, Oldfield stated that he wished for all future releases of the album to be derived from this new version. All CD releases have a stereo mix derived from the Boxed mix, as do most of the later pressings of LP and cassette. The original 1974 vinyl mix is now available on the 2010 reissue of the album, along with a 2010 remix.

An orchestral version of Hergest Ridge was arranged and conducted by David Bedford, who had previously undertaken the same tasks on The Orchestral Tubular Bells. It was performed live a number of times, and recorded for radio broadcast from concert performances twice, once in 1974 by the Royal Philharmonic Orchestra with Steve Hillage on guitar, and once in 1976 by the Scottish National Orchestra, again with Hillage on guitar. Andy Summers played on other performances that year. Parts of its performances were used in the NASA and Tony Palmer documentary The Space Movie. The audio from the Glasgow performance was restored for the album The Original Broadcast of the Orchestral Hergest Ridge and was released on August 28, 2025.

== Reception ==
Professional ratings
Review scores
Source	Rating
AllMusic	4/5 stars
Džuboks	(Mixed)

Paul Stump commented on Hergest Ridge in his 1997 History of Progressive Rock: "So how to follow Tubular Bells? Simple. Merely repeat its developmental techniques through new (but less inspired) sequences of tunes."

== Hergest Ridge, the place ==
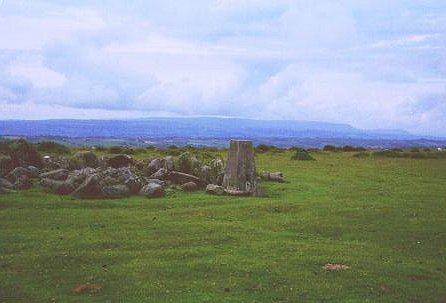
The summit of Hergest Ridge

Hergest Ridge on the England–Wales border is a popular holiday destination for Oldfield's fans, and the house where he lived at the time, The Beacon, is now a guest house. The cover photograph features scenery from Hergest Ridge, and was taken by Trevor Key; the Irish Wolfhound on the cover (and on the LP label) was named Bootleg. Mike Oldfield himself can be heard pronouncing it in the song "On Horseback", which concludes "Part Two" of Ommadawn.

Although the album was written at The Beacon, it was, like Tubular Bells, recorded at Richard Branson's The Manor.

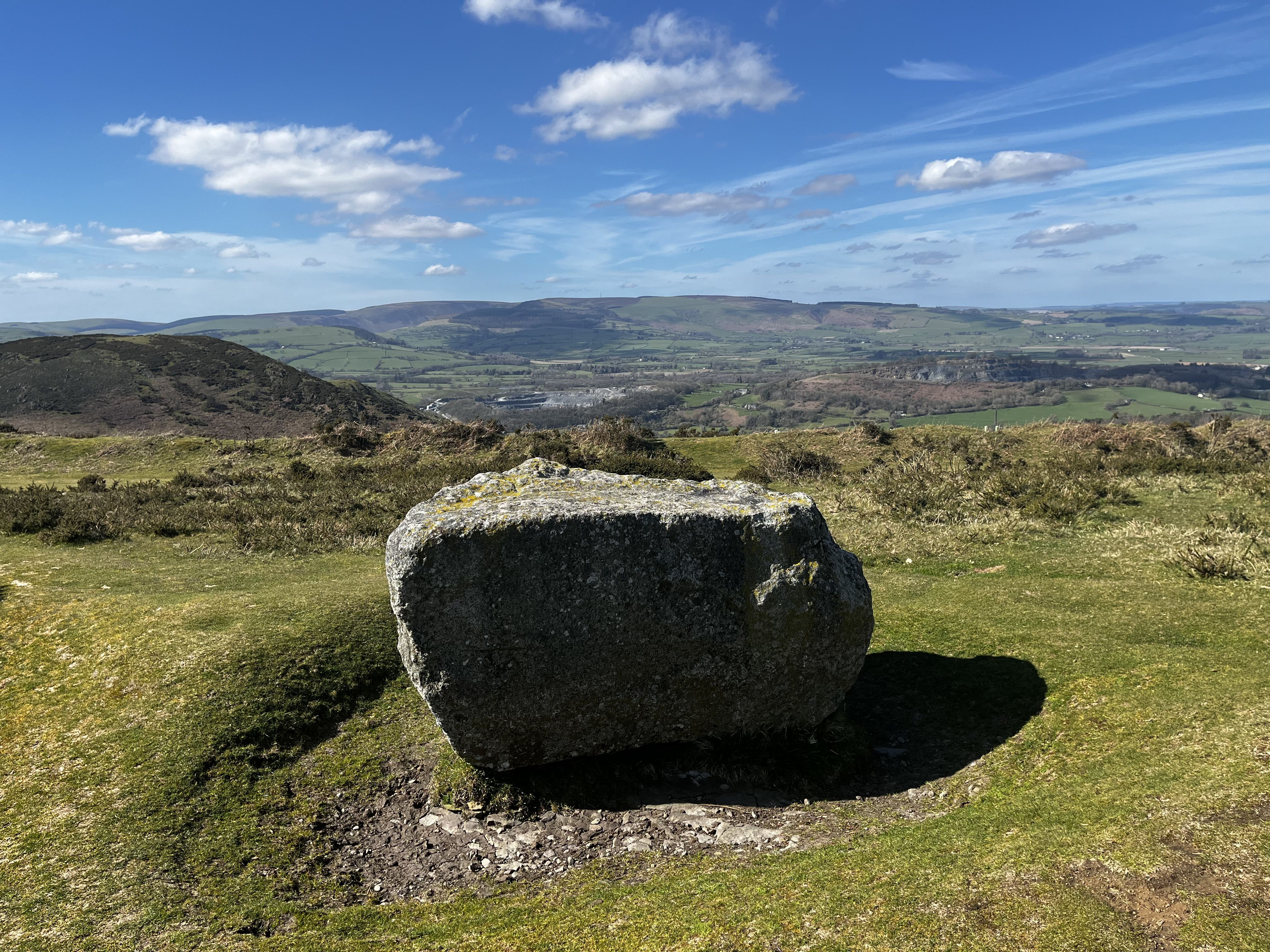
Whet stone in Hergest Ridge

The whet stone near the Monkey Puzzle trees was used for the LP "Hergest Ridge 1974 Demo Recordings" of Mike Oldfield from 2024

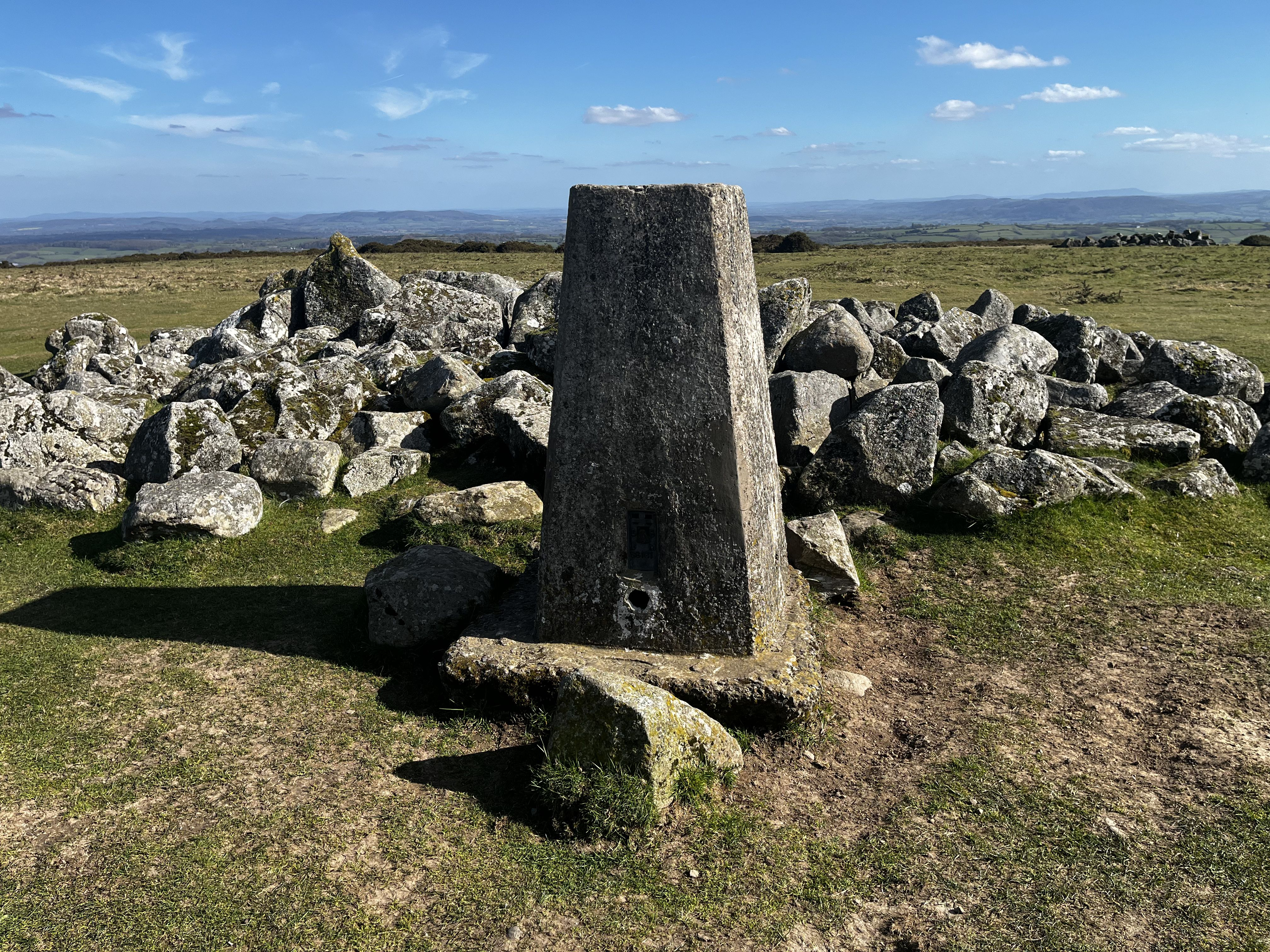
Loose pile of stones on a hill in Hergest Ridge

The loose pile of stones at a trail junction was used for the cover of Mike Oldfield's 1976 orchestral recording of “Hergest Ridge.”

== Track listing ==
All music is composed by Mike Oldfield.

Side one
No.	Title	Length
1.	"Hergest Ridge (Part One)"	21:29

Side two
No.	Title	Length
1.	"Hergest Ridge (Part Two)"	18:45

== Personnel ==
Credits are adapted from the 1974 liner notes.

Musicians

- Mike Oldfield – electric and acoustic guitars, bass guitar, glockenspiel, sleigh bells, mandolin, nutcracker, timpani, gong, Spanish guitar, Farfisa organ, Lowrey organ, GEM Gemini organ
- June Whiting – oboe
- Lindsay Cooper – oboe
- Ted Hobart – trumpet
- Terry Oldfield – flute
- Chilli Charles – snare drum
- Clodagh Simonds – vocals
- Sally Oldfield – vocals
- David Bedford – choir and strings conductor

Production

- Mike Oldfield – production, engineering
- Tom Newman – production and engineering assistant
- Trevor Key – album cover
- Bootleg – Irish Wolfhound on the album cover

== HDCD remastered reissue ==
In 2000 Virgin re-released all of Oldfield's back catalogue, remastered in High Definition Compatible Digital, by Simon Heyworth at Chop 'em Out studios between March and April 2000, from the 1976 Boxed Quad mix. The album was re-released on 29 May 2000. The "lyrics" in Part 2 are clearer in this version, although they remain undecipherable, largely comprising words made up by Clodagh Simonds. She repeated this approach on Ommadawn, though with the inclusion of some Irish Gaelic terminology.

== Mercury Records reissue ==
On 7 June 2010 the album was re-released by Mercury Records. This came as part of a deal in which Oldfield's Virgin albums were transferred to Universal's label. Bonus features for the release include a 2010 remix of the album and the original vinyl mix of the album. There is a single disc edition as well as a Deluxe Edition. Bonus tracks include "In Dulci Jubilo (For Maureen)" and "Spanish Tune". A 180 gram vinyl version was released as part of the Back to Black range.

The reissue features radically different artwork, which features a model glider and aerial photography based on Google Earth and Bluesky. According to the new liner notes, Oldfield was never entirely happy with the original album artwork and took this opportunity to commission a new cover.

There is also a limited-edition box set of the album, comprising a deluxe edition, an LP and a framed, signed print of the album artwork. Only 250 copies were produced, which were sold through Mike Oldfield's official website. There are no un-signed variants.

The Japanese release uses the SHM-CD (Super High Material CD) manufacturing process.

=== Single disc edition ===
1. "Hergest Ridge {Part One}" (2010 stereo mix) – 19:21
2. "Hergest Ridge {Part Two}" (2010 stereo mix) – 18:46
3. "In Dulci Jubilo (For Maureen)" – 2:46
4. "Spanish Tune" – 3:11

=== Back to Black vinyl edition ===
1. "Hergest Ridge {Part One}" (1974 stereo mix)
2. "Hergest Ridge {Part Two}" (1974 stereo mix)

=== Limited edition ===
Limited edition available through mikeoldfieldofficial.com, which contains the deluxe edition the vinyl edition and a numbered framed print of the cover artwork, signed by Mike Oldfield. Also includes Walking the Hergest Ridge booklet. Only 250 copies were available on pre-order prior to the release on 14 June 2010.

=== Digital edition ===
1. "Hergest Ridge {Part One}" (2010 stereo mix)
2. "Hergest Ridge {Part Two}" (2010 stereo mix)
3. "Hergest Ridge {Part One}" (1974 stereo mix)
4. "Hergest Ridge {Part Two}" (1974 stereo mix)
5. "Hergest Ridge {Part One}" (1974 demo recordings)
6. "Hergest Ridge (Part Two)" (1974 demo recordings)

=== Deluxe edition ===
CD 1

1. "Hergest Ridge {Part One}" (2010 stereo mix) – 19:21
2. "Hergest Ridge {Part Two}" (2010 stereo mix) – 18:46
3. "In Dulci Jubilo (For Maureen)" – 2:46
4. "Spanish Tune" – 3:11

CD 2

1. "Hergest Ridge {Part One}" (1974 stereo mix) – 21:32
2. "Hergest Ridge {Part Two}" (1974 stereo mix) – 18:40
3. "Hergest Ridge {Part One}" (1974 demo recordings) – 20:21
4. "Hergest Ridge {Part Two}" (1974 demo recordings) – 18:13

DVD

1. "Hergest Ridge {Part One}" (2010 5.1 surround mix)
2. "Hergest Ridge {Part Two}" (2010 5.1 surround mix)

== Charts ==
Hergest Ridge was the UK's number one album in the week ending 14 September 1974 and remained so for three weeks until being knocked out of the spot by its predecessor, Tubular Bells. Oldfield is thus one of only a few artists (among whom are the Beatles and Bob Dylan) to have swapped number one albums in this manner.

In 1975, Rolling Stone reported that 2 million copies of the album had been sold.

Chart performance for Hergest Ridge
Chart (1974)	Peak position
Australian Albums (Kent Music Report)	12
Canada Top Albums/CDs (RPM)	91
Dutch Albums (Album Top 100)	12
UK Albums (Official Charts)	1
US Billboard 200	87
Chart (2010)	Peak position
Spanish Albums (Promusicae)	54

== Certifications and sales ==
Certifications for Hergest Ridge
Region	Certification	Certified units/sales
United Kingdom (BPI)	Gold	100,000^{^}
Worldwide	—	2,000,000
^{^} Shipments figures based on certification alone.
