= Blue Peter (instrumental) =

- The cover artwork with text at the bottom that states "Part of the proceeds of the sale of this record are being donated to the Blue Peter Cambodia Appeal"

Single by Mike Oldfield
- B-side: "Woodhenge"
- Released: 30 November 1979
- Recorded: 1979
- Genre: Folk
- Length: 2:07
- Label: Virgin
- Songwriter(s): Herbert Ashworth-Hope
- Producer(s): Mike Oldfield

Mike Oldfield singles chronology
"Guilty" (1979)	"Blue Peter" (1979)	"Arrival" (1980)

"Blue Peter" is a single by musician Mike Oldfield, released in 1979 on the Virgin label. It is a rendition of the theme tune for the British children's television show Blue Peter and was used by the show between 1979 and 1989. It is a new version of the original theme tune "Barnacle Bill", written by Herbert Ashworth-Hope.

== Blue Peter ==
The royalties from the single went to the Cambodia appeal launched by the children's show. It charted at number 19 in the UK Singles Chart.

Mike Oldfield's version of the Blue Peter theme was the first time the arrangement had changed since the programme began in 1958, and it had its genesis in his appearance on the programme in 1979 to demonstrate how modern pop music was created using multi-track recording techniques. The result was liked enough by both the viewers and programme producers to be retained as the permanent theme, and Oldfield additionally recorded a new version of the programme's closing music, which runs for just 20 seconds and has never been commercially released.

The released version of the theme is actually a further re-recording, which incorporates many subtle changes compared to the TV version, in addition to eliminating the opening snare drum roll, extending the piece to a more suitable duration for commercial release, and being mixed in stereo. The TV version was mono-only (British television was not broadcasting in stereo at that time) and has never been made available for sale.

== Télétourisme ==
The song was also used by the Belgian public TV broadcaster, RTBF, as the theme for Télétourisme, a TV show that ran more than 34 years. The theme was dropped after 20 years of use but came back during the 25th anniversary of the show and remained to its conclusion.

== Music video ==
The music video for "Blue Peter" shows Oldfield competing in a race with various kinds of vehicles. The intro is filmed in black and white and begins with a silent film style title card 'Episode 4 "The Race"'; there is a second card after a short sequence with Oldfield and another man, displaying 'Zhree, Two, vun Actshun!' (meaning 'Three, Two, One, Action!'). The race then begins, three of the competitors are Oldfield himself (filmed in different shots as a pilot, pirate and a man with a moustache) and some are not. The vehicles include hovercraft, a tricycle hang glider, a helicopter, a three-wheeled ATV, a larger ATV and a kite buggy. The end of the video appears to parody the His Master's Voice logo with a gramophone and a dog. The dog is 'Muffin' belonging to Lindsay Gatward who plays the 'Pirate' character driving the Union Jack hovercraft. Paul McCullom plays the 'Charlie Chaplin' character driving the yellow hovercraft.

The video is available on the Elements – The Best of Mike Oldfield video.

== Track listing ==
1. "Blue Peter" – 2:07 (comprising "Drums and Fife" (W. Burns) and "Barnacle Bill" (Herbert Ashworth-Hope))
2. "Woodhenge" – 4:05

== Charts ==
Chart (1979)	Position
UK Singles (OCC)	19

== See also ==
- The Complete Mike Oldfield
- Elements Box
