= The Sydney Fringe =

Sydney Fringe Festival
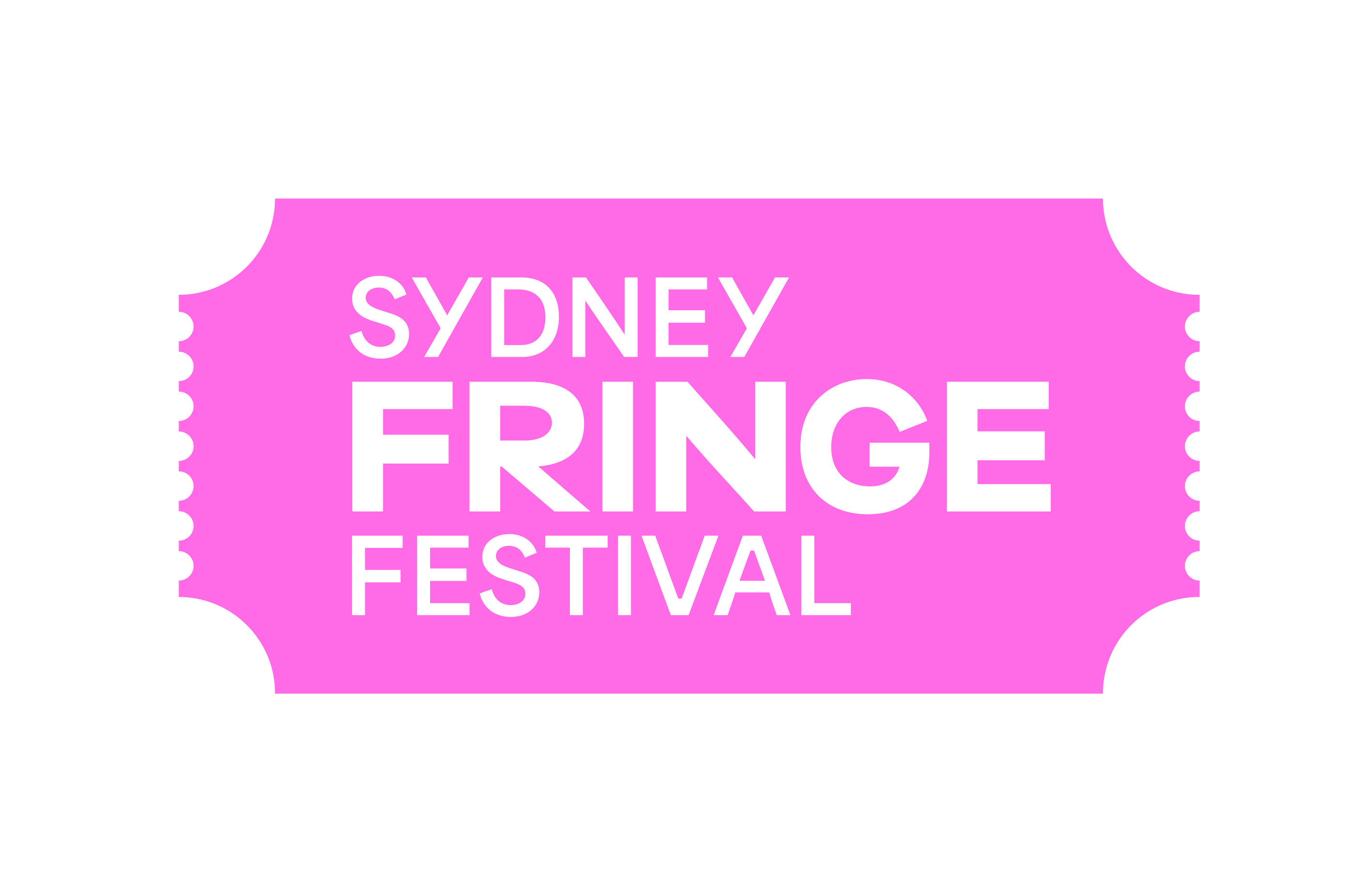
- The Sydney Fringe Festival Logo
- Genre: Arts festival
- Dates: 1–30 September
- Location: Sydney
- Country: Australia
- Years active: 2010–2019, 2021–
- Founded: 2010
- Participants: ~3,000 artists (2025)
- Attendance: ~100,000 (2024)
- Leader: Patrick Kennedy
- Website: sydneyfringe.com

The Sydney Fringe Festival is the largest independent arts festival in New South Wales and a designated Foundation Event of the state with over 450 events presented in over 89 venues across Greater Sydney each year during September. It encompasses genres such as stand-up comedy, music, theatre, cabaret, visual arts, and burlesque.

Outside of September, the Sydney Fringe Festival advocate for artists, agitate for change and activate unused space creating new cultural infrastructure and precincts.

The Sydney Fringe began as a curated festival (like the New York International Fringe Festival) as opposed to an open access "unjuried" festival (the model used by the Edinburgh Fringe Festival). In 2012, festival director Richard Hull implemented the open access festival model. From 2013-2025, festival director and CEO Kerri Glasscock led the organisation through a significant period of growth.

In 2025, theatre director Patrick Kennedy was appointed as the new Chief Executive Officer.

The Sydney Fringe operates in a festival precinct model encompassing venues in the Eastern Suburbs (Eastern Precinct), Inner West (Inner West Precinct), Sydney CBD (Central Precinct) and Greater Sydney (Greater Sydney Precinct). Each year the festival attracts over 100,000 attendees with over 3,000 artists participating across 450 events, generating an economic impact of $40.7M.

== Previous Sydney Fringe Festivals ==
The Sydney Fringe Festival ran from 1994 to 2002 in Bondi, founded by producer Victoria Harbutt and Megan Donnelly who were assisted fantastically by Cathy Carlsson, Sylvia DeAngelis, Gil Summons and Lucia Mastrantone” for four years and Katrina Sedgwick for one year. The Live Bait Festival, a successor to the Sydney Fringe Festival, also operated out of Bondi from 2003 to 2004 and was co-produced by Michael Cohen and Glenn Wright.
