= Tubular Bells =

1973 album by Mike Oldfield

Studio album by Mike Oldfield
- Released: 25 May 1973
- Recorded: November 1972 – April 1973
- Studios: The Manor, Oxfordshire
- Genres: Progressive rock; instrumental rock; new-age music
- Length: 49:18
- Label: Virgin
- Producers: Tom Newman; Simon Heyworth; Mike Oldfield

Mike Oldfield chronology
Tubular Bells (1973)	Hergest Ridge (1974)

Tubular Bells series chronology
Tubular Bells (1973)	The Orchestral Tubular Bells (1975)

Singles from Tubular Bells
- 1. "Mike Oldfield's Single" Released: 28 June 1974

Tubular Bells is the debut studio album by the English multi-instrumentalist and composer Mike Oldfield, released on 25 May 1973 as the inaugural catalogue release of Virgin Records. Comprising two largely instrumental, long-form movements, the album fuses elements of progressive rock, folk, and minimalism. Oldfield, who was 19 years old when recording began, composed most of the music and performed almost all of the instruments himself through extensive overdubbing. This production method involved dozens of complex tape layers and thousands of punched-in corrections, a process that was highly innovative for a rock release at the time. The album was recorded at The Manor Studio in Oxfordshire, funded by Virgin co-founder Richard Branson, and co-produced by Oldfield with engineers Tom Newman and Simon Heyworth. It features a diverse range of instrumentation—including various guitars, keyboards, percussion, and a set of tubular bells—culminating in a famous finale on "Part One" in which the instruments are introduced individually by the master of ceremonies Vivian Stanshall.

Although Tubular Bells initially generated slow retail sales, it gained global prominence in December 1973 after its opening piano motif was featured in William Friedkin's supernatural horror film The Exorcist. The resulting commercial surge catapulted Oldfield to international fame, established Virgin Records as a major industry force, and laid the financial foundation for the subsequent expansion of the Virgin Group. The album demonstrated historic chart longevity, entering the UK Albums Chart in July 1973 and ultimately reaching number one in October 1974, replacing Oldfield's second studio album, Hergest Ridge (1974), at the summit. An unauthorised U.S. single edit reached number 7 on the Billboard Hot 100, while the full album peaked at number 3 on the Billboard 200. It has sold an estimated 15 to 17.5 million copies worldwide, cementing its position as one of the best-selling instrumental albums of all time.

The album received widespread critical acclaim from British music publications upon release, though its reception among American critics was more mixed. It won the Grammy Award for Best Instrumental Composition in 1975 and has since been regarded as a pioneering masterpiece of progressive and new-age music, receiving an induction into the Grammy Hall of Fame in 2018. An orchestral arrangement by David Bedford was released in 1975 as The Orchestral Tubular Bells. Oldfield subsequently expanded the project into a multimedia franchise, producing four direct sequels between 1992 and 1999 and a digital re-recording in 2003. The album's iconic artwork, designed by Trevor Key, was commemorated by the Royal Mail in a 2010 special postage stamp issue. Oldfield initially resisted live touring, performing the work only twice in 1973, before permanently integrating it into his regular concert repertoire from 1979 onward. Its enduring contribution to British cultural history was later celebrated when Oldfield performed excerpts from the work live during the 2012 Summer Olympics opening ceremony in London.

== Background ==
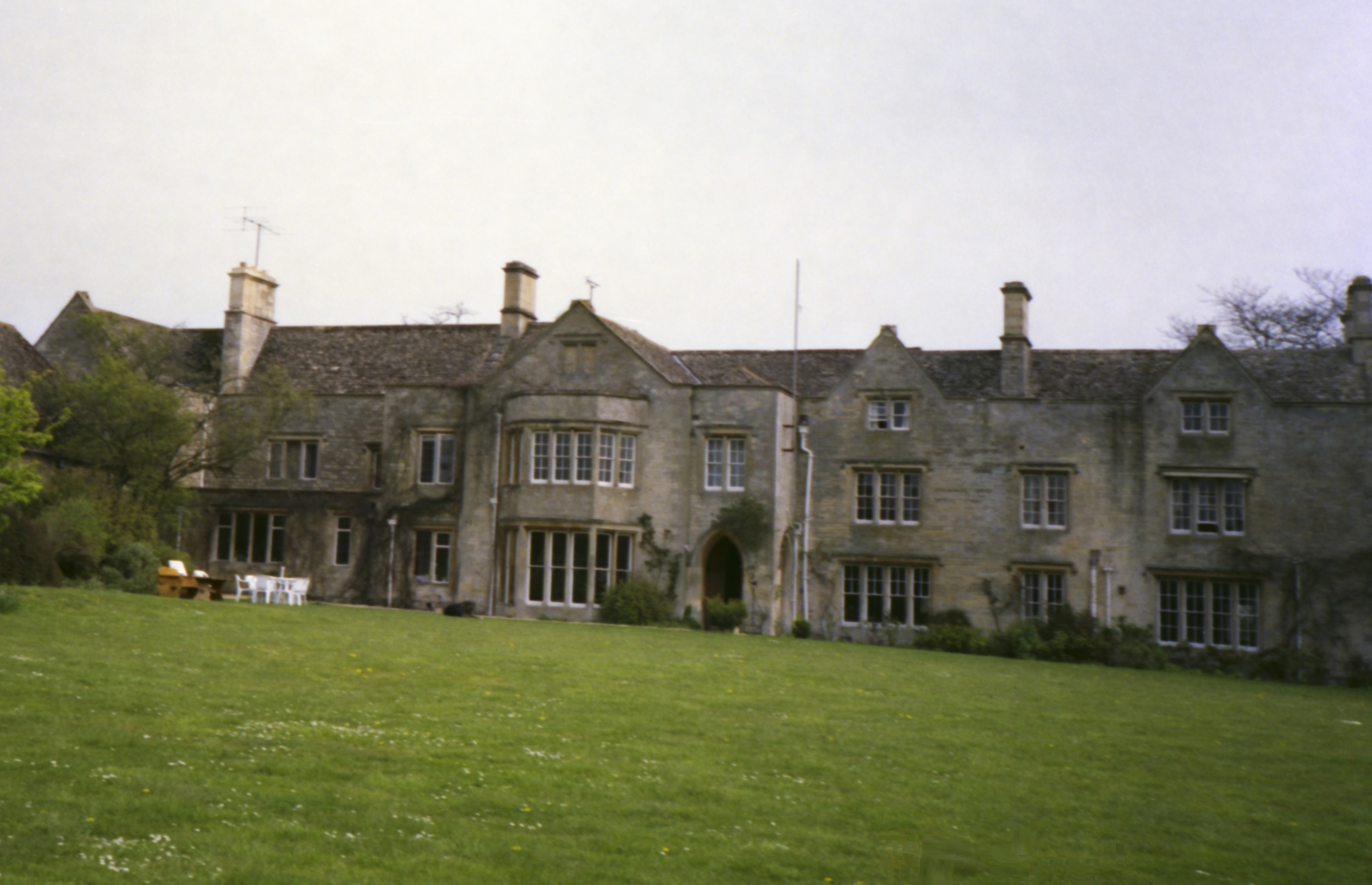
The Manor Studio in Oxfordshire, where the album was recorded.

Oldfield learned to play the guitar at an early age, performing in local folk clubs by the age of 12. As a teenager, he was hired as the bass player for the Whole World, a progressive rock band formed by former Soft Machine vocalist Kevin Ayers. In 1970, when Oldfield was 17 years old, the group spent several months at Abbey Road Studios recording their album Shooting at the Moon (1970). When the group did not have recording time booked, Oldfield arrived at the studio early to experiment with the array of instruments left in the rooms, including harpsichords, orchestral percussion, a Mellotron, and a set of tubular bells, teaching himself how to play each one.

Following the dissolution of the Whole World in mid-1971, Ayers lent Oldfield a two-track Bang & Olufsen Beocord quarter-inch tape recorder. By modifying the machine with wire cutters and adhesive tape to block the erase head, Oldfield was able to bounce recorded audio from one tape track to the other while superimposing a new instrument. This makeshift overdubbing technique allowed him to create complex, multi-layered prototype recordings in his apartment in Tottenham, North London.

Using his guitars, bass, toy bells, and a Farfisa organ also borrowed from Ayers, Oldfield recorded a series of multi-layered home demos. The tapes contained three shorter melodies—early versions of the segments later titled "Peace", "Bagpipe Guitars", and "Caveman"—and a longer, continuous piece provisionally titled "Opus One". Oldfield was inspired to compose a long-form instrumental work after attending live performances by Keith Tippett's 50-piece jazz orchestra, Centipede, whose extended compositions he wanted to adapt into a rock format. He was also influenced by classical music, particularly the works of Bach, and the experimental, cyclical overdubbing techniques used by minimalist composer Terry Riley on his 1969 album A Rainbow in Curved Air.

Late in 1971, Oldfield worked as a session guitarist for musician Arthur Louis, who was recording demo tracks at The Manor Studio. The residential facility was being constructed inside a former squash court at a manor house in Shipton-on-Cherwell, Oxfordshire, which had recently been purchased by entrepreneur Richard Branson. The site was managed by Branson's newly appointed house producers and engineers, Tom Newman and Simon Heyworth. Although Oldfield was reclusive and socially reserved, Newman and Heyworth were impressed by his technical capability on the guitar. When Oldfield mentioned his own home tapes, one of Louis' roadies offered to drive him back to his flat in Tottenham to retrieve the reels. Oldfield later highlighted the significance of the roadie's gesture, stating that he "owed him everything; none of what came later would have happened if it weren't for him." Newman and Heyworth copied the collection onto a four-track machine and promised to pitch the project to Branson and his business partner, Simon Draper. Newman later noted that he originally preferred the distinct nature of the demos: "They were complete melodies in themselves – with intros and fade-outs or ends. I liked them very much and was a little nonplussed when Mike strung them all together." Draper heard the tape and thought the music was "staggeringly good" and a "wonderful intricate piece of music."

Throughout 1972, Oldfield assisted his former bandmates on their respective solo projects while shopping his tape to various industry entities. Major companies, including EMI, CBS, and Pye Records, rejected the submission, declaring an instrumental suite unmarketable without pop vocals or drums. Increasingly destitute, Oldfield considered contacting the Soviet Embassy in London after reading that the Soviet Union subsidised state-employed classical musicians. While he was looking up their telephone number in the directory, Draper called him with an invitation to dinner on Branson's houseboat in Little Venice to discuss the possibility of turning his demos into an album. Branson expressed enthusiasm for the music and granted Oldfield one week of studio time at the Manor to formally record "Opus One".

== Recording ==
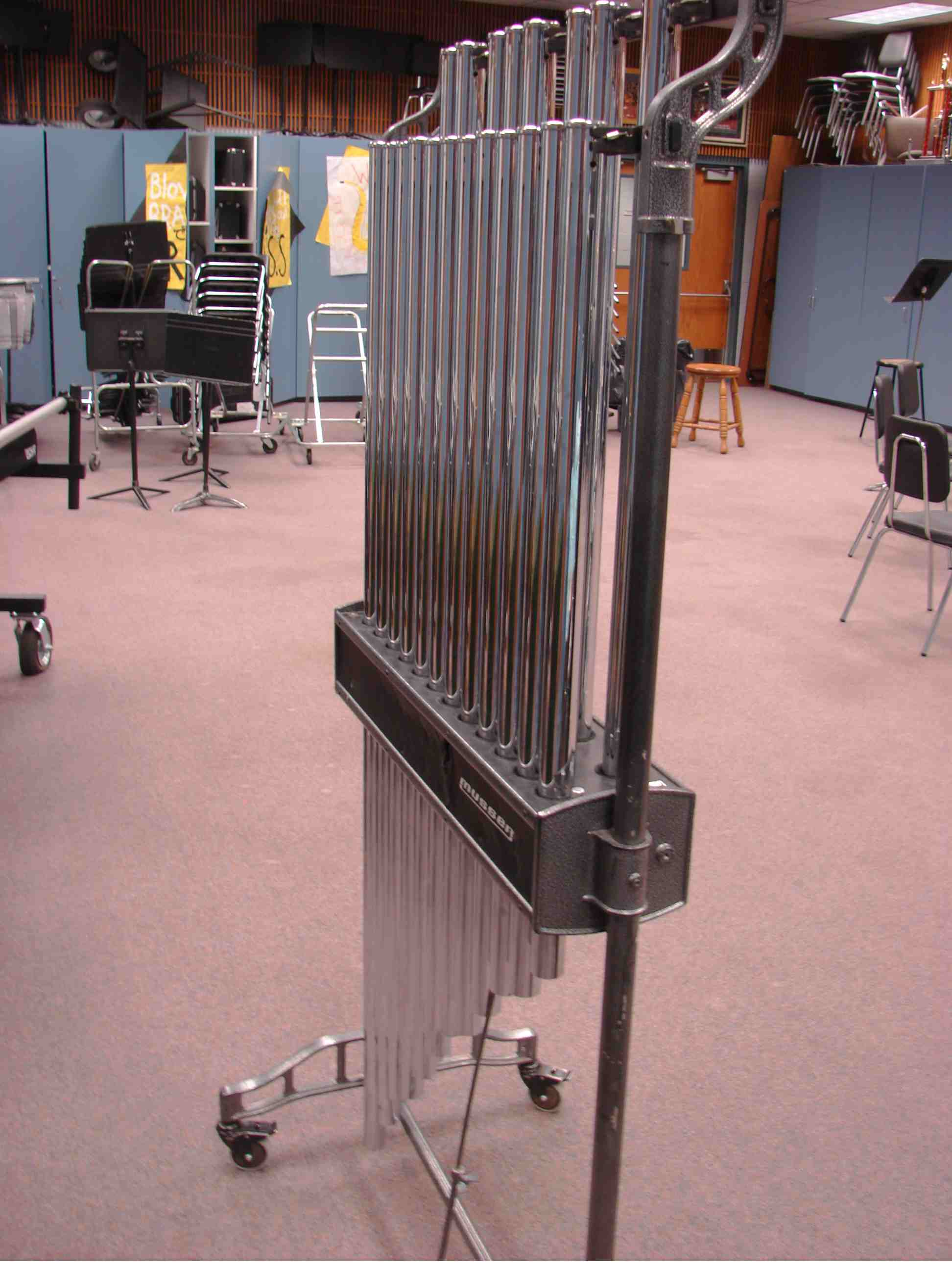
A set of orchestral tubular bells. During the tracking of "Part One", Oldfield struck the instrument with a large carpenter's hammer to achieve the loud, distorted chime that finishes the movement.

Tubular Bells was recorded using a 20-channel mixing console designed by Audio Developments and an Ampex 2-inch 16-track tape recorder equipped with a Dolby noise-reduction system. Oldfield had Virgin Records hire a variety of instruments for the sessions, including guitars, keyboards, and assorted percussion. He has recounted differing accounts over the years regarding the acquisition of the tubular bells themselves; in 2001, he suggested that they were included on the list of instruments he explicitly requested Branson to hire, but in 2013, he stated that he spotted them among equipment being wheeled out of the studio after John Cale had finished a recording session and requested that they be left behind.

Oldfield, Newman, and Heyworth routinely spent their evenings at a local public house before returning to The Manor to record through the night. Heyworth recalled several technical setbacks during these late-night sessions, including an incident where half a day's multi-track work was accidentally erased. Final mixing was an intricate process that required the console faders to be operated by Oldfield, Newman, Heyworth, and two additional studio assistants simultaneously. The team followed detailed physical tracking charts, restarting the entire mix pass from the beginning if any individual made a timing error. During the subsequent disc cutting process, Heyworth encountered difficulties due to the limited dynamic range of standard vinyl; to prevent distortion from the dense musical layers, he insisted on pressing the album on heavy-grade vinyl typically reserved for classical music records.

Oldfield performed the majority of the instrumentation as a series of overdubs, which was an uncommon recording technique for a rock release at the time. Contemporary media reports stated that 274 separate overdubs were completed alongside an estimated 2,000 "punch-ins"; however, Newman disputed these high metrics, recalling that "it was really only 70 or 80" in total.

Despite various guitar variations being designated on the album sleeve—including "speed guitars", "fuzz guitars", and "guitars sounding like bagpipes"—the singular electric guitar used throughout the sessions was a 1966 blonde Fender Telecaster formerly owned by Marc Bolan, to which Oldfield had added an extra Bill Lawrence pickup. The guitars were tracked via direct injection straight into the mixing console. To generate the "speed guitar" and "mandolin-like guitar" sounds listed in the liner notes, the tape machine was run at half-speed during capture. A physical acoustic mandolin was featured only during the conclusion of "Part Two".

Oldfield also employed a custom, wooden-cased effects unit known as the Glorfindel box to produce the distorted "fuzz" and "bagpipe" guitar textures. (Note: The Glorfindel box, named after a character in Tolkien's legendarium, was presented to Bedford at a party, who subsequently gave it to Oldfield. Newman criticised the unit in a 2001 interview with Q magazine, noting that it was highly unreliable and rarely yielded the same audio result twice.) In February 2011, Oldfield's Telecaster was sold at auction for £6,500, with all proceeds donated to the mental health charity SANE. According to studio engineer Phil Newell, the bass guitar used on the album was one of Newell's own late-1960s Fender Telecaster Bass.

=== Side one ===
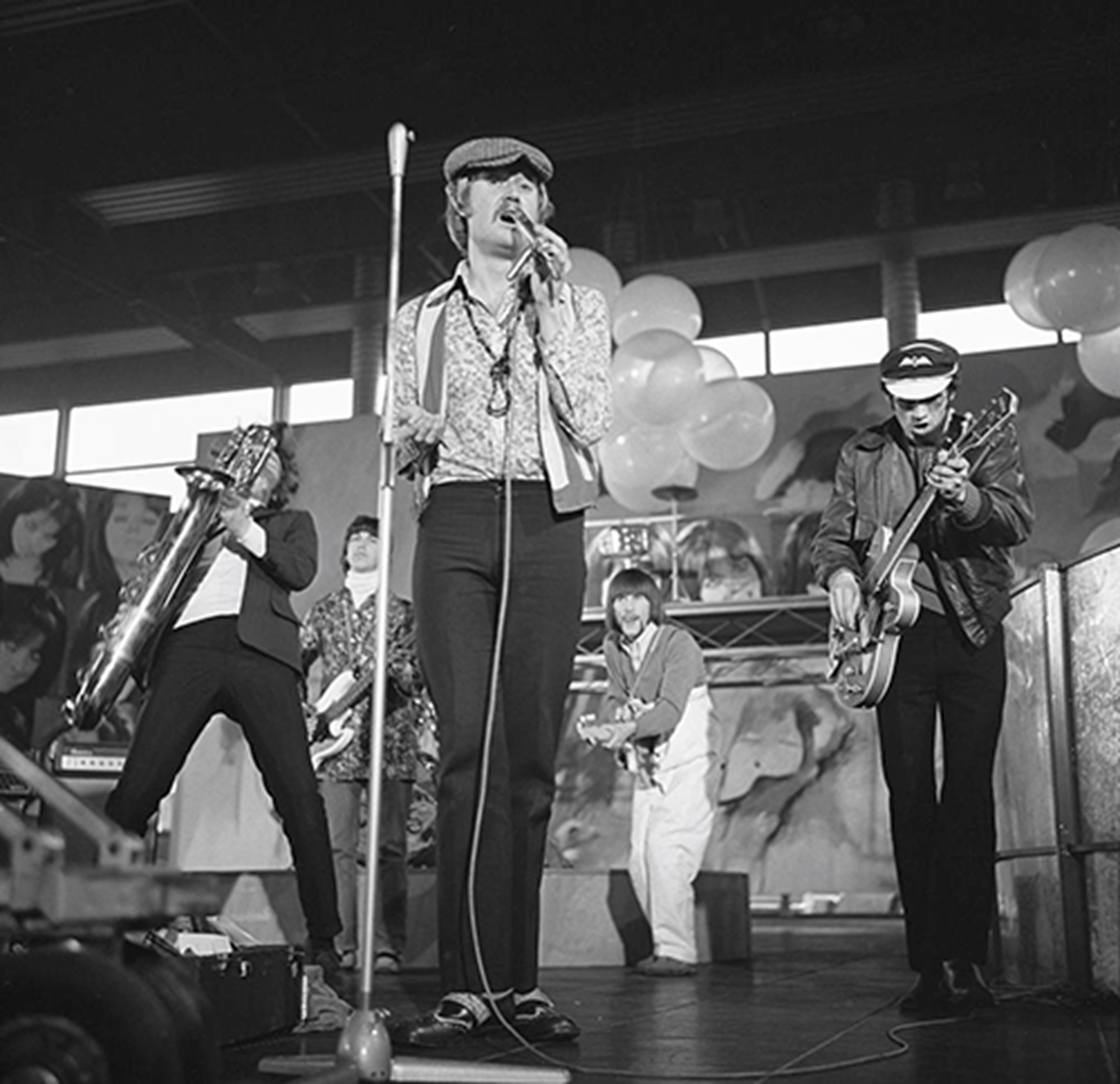
Vivian Stanshall (centre) performing with the Bonzo Dog Doo-Dah Band in 1968. Stanshall was tracking at The Manor concurrently with Oldfield, who recruited him to act as Master of Ceremonies for the multi-instrumental climax of "Part One".

Oldfield recorded side one, known as "Opus One" at the time, during his single allotted week at The Manor in November 1972. Aiming to open the piece with a repeating melodic phrase, he devised the foundational piano sequence after experimenting for several minutes on Bedford's Farfisa organ. He constructed a variation on a 16/8 meter by dropping the final sixteenth beat, choosing the key of A minor to ensure facility of performance. Although Oldfield recorded the opening riff on a Steinway grand piano, he initially struggled to maintain exact tempo. Heyworth resolved the issue by positioning a microphone next to a physical metronome in an adjacent room and routing the audio feed directly into Oldfield's headphones. A brief honky-tonk piano section was integrated as a tribute to Oldfield's grandmother, who had performed on the instrument in public houses prior to World War II. The accompanying "nasal choir" vocal layers were performed collectively by the staff and studio employees at The Manor. Oldfield encountered difficulty generating sufficient dynamic output from the tubular bells; neither the standard leather-wrapped mallets nor the bare metal hammers achieved the volume he desired. Newman subsequently sourced a heavy metal claw hammer, which Oldfield utilised to reach the intended intensity, cracking the physical instruments in the process.

The movement concludes with a finale featuring Vivian Stanshall, formerly the frontman of the comedic rock group the Bonzo Dog Doo-Dah Band, who introduces each instrument individually as it joins the arrangement. The collaboration originated when the Bonzo Dog Doo-Dah Band arrived to track at The Manor while Oldfield's sessions were still active. Oldfield admired Stanshall's sequential instrument introductions on the Bonzos' 1967 track "The Intro and the Outro" from the album Gorilla, and requested that Newman approach Stanshall for a similar contribution. Stanshall accepted the request and was credited on the album liner notes as the "Master of Ceremonies". Newman recalled that tracking the section proved difficult because Stanshall repeatedly forgot the sequence of the instruments and executed his entries out of sync. To resolve the issue, Oldfield compiled a structured physical cue list specifying the precise timing for each vocal introduction. Stanshall's unique delivery of the line "plus... tubular bells" subsequently inspired Oldfield to adopt the phrase as the definitive title of the album.

=== Side two ===
After "Part One" had been recorded, Oldfield was allowed to stay on at The Manor to record additional overdubs during studio downtime. He spent Christmas and New Year at his family's home, but returned to the Manor from February to April 1973 to record the second part of his planned album. Oldfield had "Part Two" mapped out and sequenced by the time he came to record it.

The "caveman" section is the only part of Tubular Bells that features a drum kit, which is played by Steve Broughton of the Edgar Broughton Band. The section begins with a backing track of bass and drums, with Oldfield overdubbing all other instruments. The shouting vocals developed near the end of the recording, when Oldfield had practically finished tracking the instruments for the section but felt it required an additional element. Heyworth recalled that Branson was growing impatient and pressured Oldfield to deliver the album, requesting vocals on one of the tracks so the label could release it as a single. Angered by Branson's suggestion, Oldfield returned to the Manor, drank half a bottle of Jameson whiskey from the studio's cellar, and demanded that Heyworth record him. While heavily intoxicated, Oldfield "screamed his brains out for 10 minutes" into a microphone, an incident that left him so hoarse he was unable to speak for two weeks. Heyworth ran the tape deck at a higher speed during the recording so that upon playback at standard speed, the pitch of the vocal track dropped to produce the "Piltdown Man" vocals listed on the credits.

"Part Two" closes with a rendition of "The Sailor's Hornpipe", a track Oldfield had been performing since his time in The Whole World. The track was originally preceded by a longer version of the piece featuring an inebriated, improvised vocal tour of the Manor by Stanshall over a musical backing of mandolin and acoustic guitar played by Oldfield and Newman. The session occurred at 4:00 am following an evening of drinking. Newman placed microphones in various rooms of the building to track the trio as they moved unplanned through the house. Although a traditional instrumental performance was ultimately selected for the final album master, Stanshall's alternative version was later included on Oldfield's Boxed compilation box set in 1976.

== Sleeve design ==
The album cover was designed and photographed by Trevor Key, who was suggested to Virgin Records by press officer Sue Steward. Key and his partner Brian Cooke operated the design agency Cooke Key Associates, which became the young label's de facto art department. While illustrator Roger Dean had created Virgin's original psychedelic "Gemini" corporate logo for the label's launch, Cooke Key Associates would later design Virgin's iconic "signature scrawl" logo in 1978 to match the punk aesthetic of the newly signed Sex Pistols.

Key originally presented an early portfolio concept featuring a bloody boiled egg, which Branson favoured for his intended album title of Breakfast in Bed. Oldfield rejected both the title and the artwork. A modified version of this image, substituting the blood with egg yolk, was later repurposed for the cover of Oldfield's final Virgin album, Heaven's Open (1991). The back cover of the album contains a tongue-in-cheek warning: "This stereo record cannot be played on old tin boxes no matter what they are fitted with. If you are in possession of such equipment please hand it into the nearest police station."

To capture the beach backdrop, Steward accompanied Key to the Sussex coast on a bitterly cold day. Key spent several hours photographing the seascape to get his desired shot of the waves, and burned bones on the shore to photograph for the back cover. The front cover's iconic chrome "bent bell" was inspired by the physical damage Oldfield had caused to the tubular bells while playing them during the recording sessions. Key constructed a triangular model of the bent bell out of chrome tubing, photographed it in his studio, and used pre-computer analogue techniques to superimpose it onto the beach photograph. Captivated by the final composition, Oldfield requested that his name and the album title be printed in small, pale orange letters to avoid distracting from the artwork. Key was paid £100 for the project, but the commission established his career. Through Cooke Key Associates and later partnerships with art director Peter Saville, he went on to design sleeves for New Order, Orchestral Manoeuvres in the Dark, and Tangerine Dream.

The bent bell graphic became synonymous with Oldfield's career, serving as the logo for his personal music company, Oldfield Music Ltd, and appearing on the sleeve of every Tubular Bells sequel. In January 2010, the Royal Mail selected the sleeve as one of ten designs featured in its "Classic Album Cover" postage stamp collection, alongside works such as The Rolling Stones' Let It Bleed, Led Zeppelin's IV, David Bowie's The Rise and Fall of Ziggy Stardust and the Spiders from Mars, The Clash's London Calling, and Pink Floyd's The Division Bell.

== Release ==
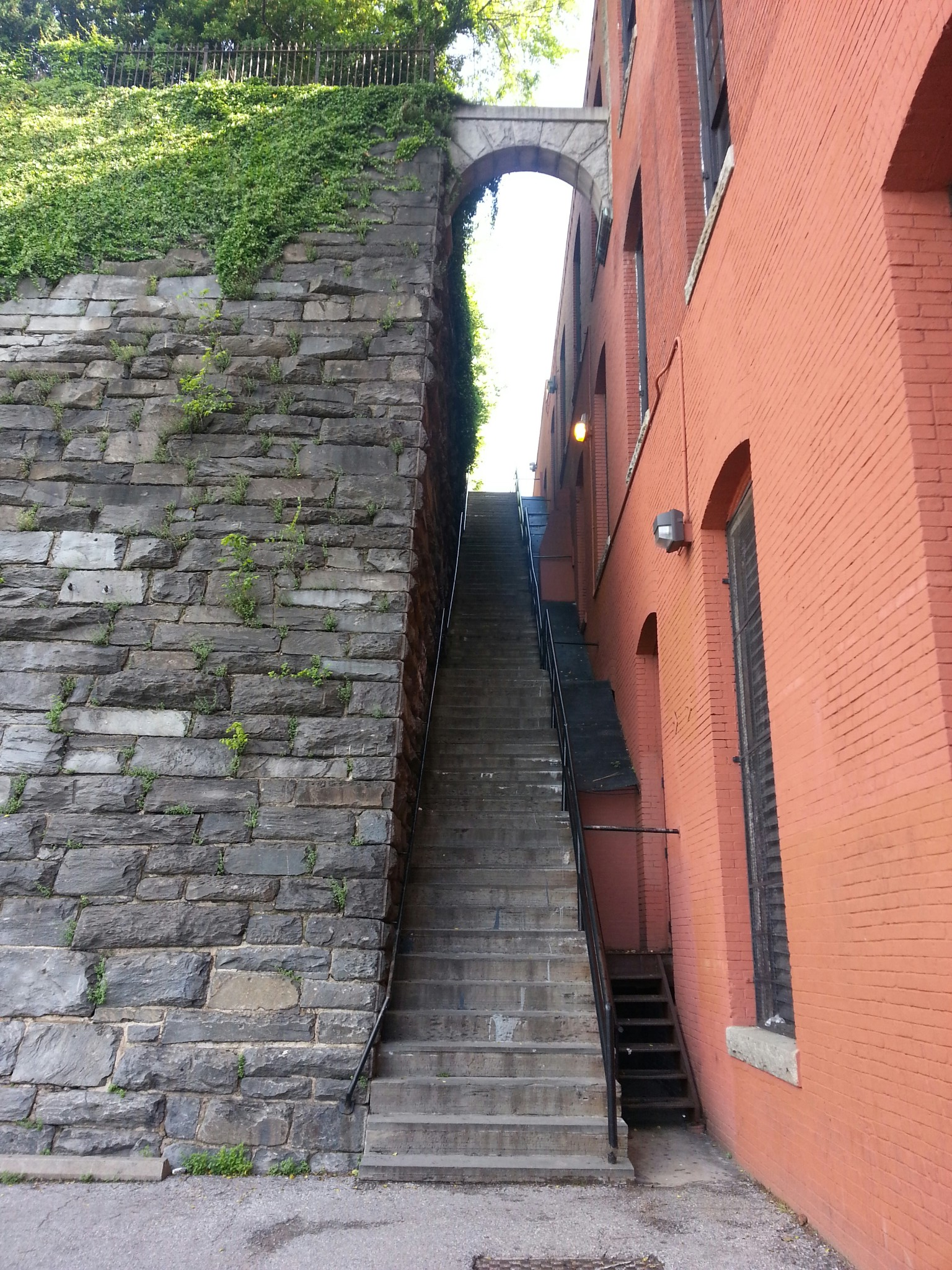
The "Exorcist steps" in Georgetown, Washington, D.C. Global sales of Tubular Bells surged dramatically after its opening theme was featured in the 1973 horror film The Exorcist.

In January 1973, Richard Branson attended the MIDEM music conference in Cannes, France, to pitch side one of the album to international music companies. An executive from an American label offered $20,000 to acquire the record, but only on the condition that vocals were added to the instrumental tracks. The rejection of this proposal prompted Branson and Draper to consider distributing the album via a mail-order operation, before electing to launch their own independent label, Virgin Records, with Tubular Bells selected as its inaugural catalog release. The album was officially released in the United Kingdom on 25 May 1973, and subsequently debuted in North America that October.

Initial commercial performance was slow, and Tubular Bells did not enter the UK Albums Chart until July 1973, when it climbed to an initial peak of number 7. Sales accelerated globally following the December 1973 release of William Friedkin's horror film The Exorcist, which featured the album's opening piano motif as its central musical theme. Oldfield later attributed the melody's memorable appeal to its unusual 15/8 time signature, describing the complex cadence as "a puzzle with a little bit missing." Driven by the cinematic exposure, the album became a permanent fixture at the top of the British charts, dropping out of the UK Top 10 for only four weeks between February 1974 and May 1975. Sixteen months after its debut, it reached number 1 on the week ending 5 October 1974, displacing Oldfield's second album, Hergest Ridge (1974), which had held the top spot for the prior three weeks.

By overtaking his own record for the number-one position, Oldfield became only the second artist in British chart history to replace himself at the summit of the album charts, following the Beatles in 1963 and 1964. The milestone was only subsequently matched by Michael Jackson and David Bowie, both achieving the feat posthumously. Tubular Bells demonstrated historic chart longevity, achieving re-entries in every single decade following its release and accumulating 288 weeks on the primary chart roster.

On 22 April 2007, the album became the centre of music industry controversy when EMI—which had acquired Virgin Records—authorised a promotional giveaway with The Mail on Sunday. The newspaper covermounted and distributed 2.25 million free CD copies of the original album in a cardboard sleeve replicating the artwork, prompting widespread criticism from high-street retailers over the perceived devaluation of classic albums. The newspaper defended the promotion in trade press advertisements, noting that retail sales of full-priced copies of the album concurrently increased by 30% due to the heightened visibility. Oldfield publicly condemned the decision, stating that he was completely excluded from the consultation process and felt the broad giveaway cheapened the legacy of his debut work.

Tubular Bells has gone on to sell an estimated 15 million copies globally. In the United Kingdom, pure sales have surpassed 2.63 million copies; a performance that cemented its place as the 42nd-best-selling album of all time on the Official UK Charts.

=== Singles ===
Although Oldfield originally conceived Tubular Bells as a continuous, long-form piece, the album was adapted into shorter edits for the singles market. In February 1974, the album's United States distributor, Atlantic Records, released a commercial single featuring a condensed edit of the first three segments from "Part One". Issued without Oldfield's authorisation, the single was designed to capitalise on the worldwide box office success of The Exorcist. The release achieved commercial success, climbing to number 7 on the U.S. Billboard Hot 100 chart on 11 May 1974 and reaching number 15 on the Billboard Adult Contemporary chart. In Canada, the single was distributed under the title "Tubular Bells (Theme from Exorcist)", peaking at number 3 on the RPM Top Singles chart on 18 May 1974 and eventually ranking at number 103 on RPM's year-end list of the top 200 singles for 1974.

In response to the growing demand for a shorter variant in the European market, Oldfield recorded an official 7-inch single version, which was released by Virgin in the United Kingdom in June 1974. Titled "Mike Oldfield's Single", the release peaked at number 31 on the UK Singles Chart. Rather than performing a simple edit of the original studio tapes, Oldfield constructed a pastoral re-recording of the "bagpipe guitars" segment from "Part Two". This configuration highlighted acoustic arrangements and featured an oboe played by Lindsay Cooper as the prominent lead melody. The traditional folk song "Froggy Went A-Courting" was recorded as the single's B-side.

== Critical reception ==
Professional ratings
Review scores
Source	Rating
AllMusic	5/5 stars
Chicago Sun-Times	4/4 stars
Creem	C+
Encyclopedia of Popular Music	5/5 stars
Q	5/5 stars

Tubular Bells received widespread acclaim from British music critics upon release. Radio DJ John Peel was an early champion of the album, playing it on his BBC Radio 1 show Top Gear on 29 May 1973, four days after its release. Peel called it "one of the most impressive LPs I've ever had the chance to play on the radio, really a remarkable record". While Oldfield recalled in his autobiography that Peel played the album in its entirety, BBC archives and surviving audio logs indicate that only Part One was broadcast. Reviewing the album for The Listener the following week, Peel described it as "a new recording of such strength and beauty that to me it represents the first break-through into history that any musician has made".

Major UK music publications echoed this praise. Al Clark of NME wrote that the album's extensive overdubbing resulted in "a remarkable piece of sustained music" and concluded that it was "one of the most mature, vital, rich and humerous [sic] pieces of music to have emerged from the pop idiom". In Melody Maker, Geoff Brown described it as a "vast work, almost classical in its structure," noting it boded well for both Oldfield and the newly formed Virgin label. Music Week characterised Oldfield's musicianship as "flawless" and ranked it among the best releases of the year. Steve Peacock of Sounds lauded the album's "complex, interlocking carefully woven music," stating he would unhesitatingly recommend it to all readers.

A more reserved assessment came from Simon Frith in Let It Rock, who provocatively reviewed the LP alongside the Stooges' aggressive proto-punk album Raw Power to cover the opposing spectrums of 1973 popular music. Though finding Tubular Bells "satisfying", Frith questioned its categorisation as rock music, arguing that the record "lacks rock's other essence — energy" and featured "nothing uncontrolled, nothing uncontrollable".

American reviews were more mixed. Writing for Rolling Stone in November 1973, Paul Gambaccini hailed it as "the most important one-shot project of 1973" and "a major work". However, evaluating the album for the same magazine in June 1974 following its commercial breakthrough via The Exorcist soundtrack, Jon Landau dismissed the record as a "clever novelty". Landau stated the work was "light, rather showy and cute in places," and concluded that it "probably makes pleasant background music for a dinner or conversation". Robert Christgau was similarly unimpressed in Creem, calling the music merely "pleasant" and "catchy", while remarking that "this is a soundtrack because that's the level at which he operates".

In a retrospective evaluation for AllMusic, Mike DeGagne praised the record as "arguably the finest conglomeration of off-centered instruments concerted together to form a single unique piece." DeGagne highlighted the transparency of the dense arrangement, noting that "so many sounds are conjured up yet none go unnoticed," and called the record a "divine excursion into the realm of new age music".

=== Accolades ===
At the 17th Annual Grammy Awards in 1975, Oldfield won the Grammy Award for Best Instrumental Composition for "Tubular Bells – Theme From The Exorcist". In 2018, the complete album was formally inducted into the Grammy Hall of Fame for its cultural and historical significance.

Retrospective rankings have also recognized the record. In 1998, Q ranked Tubular Bells at number 6 on its list of "The 50 Best Albums of the '70s". It subsequently appeared at number 9 in the Q & Mojo Classic special issue Pink Floyd & The Story of Prog Rock features list, "40 Cosmic Rock Albums" (2005). Additionally, the album was included in the reference book 1001 Albums You Must Hear Before You Die.

== Live performances ==
=== Queen Elizabeth Hall ===
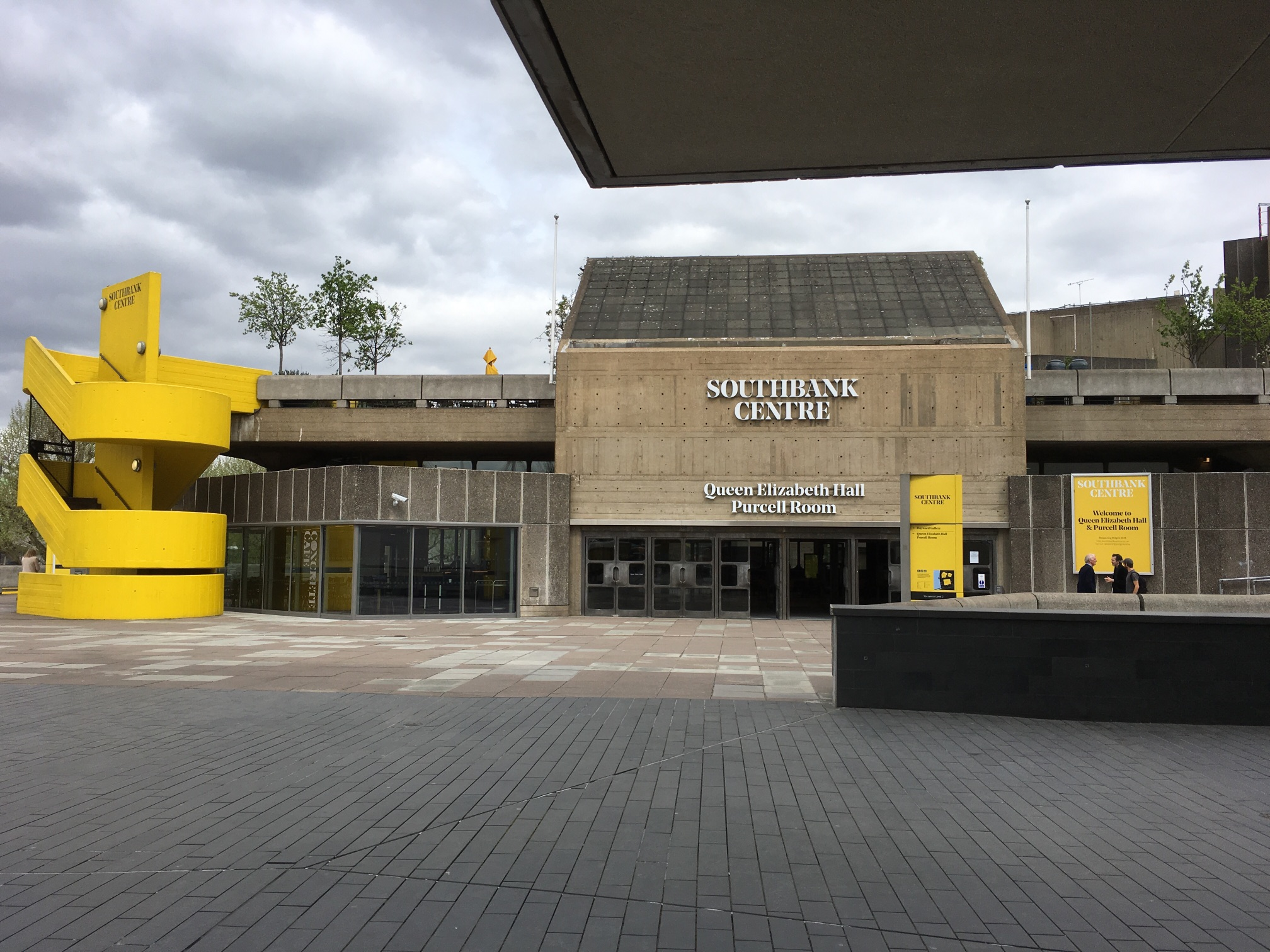
The first live performance of Tubular Bells took place at London's Queen Elizabeth Hall.

After recording Tubular Bells, Oldfield felt he had completely "got it out of his system" and was deeply reluctant to perform any promotional engagements. However, Branson and Draper believed a live performance was the best method to present the material to journalists and the public, subsequently organising a concert at London's Queen Elizabeth Hall on 25 June 1973. Oldfield remained convinced that the intricate arrangement would not translate well to a live setting and initially refused to perform despite several prominent musicians agreeing to join the one-off showcase. Desperate to ensure his participation, Branson offered to gift Oldfield his own Bentley luxury car—which Branson had purchased from George Harrison and knew Oldfield admired—on the condition that he perform the gig. Oldfield accepted the offer, but during rehearsals at Shepperton Studios, he continued to harbour severe reservations. His confidence was bolstered after Mick Taylor of the Rolling Stones brought frontman Mick Jagger backstage to meet him, providing the encouragement Oldfield needed to "at least walk on stage". The concert proceeded and was highly acclaimed by critics, leaving Oldfield "stunned".

The performance featured members of the avant-garde rock group Henry Cow and musicians associated with the Canterbury scene. Steve Winwood and Robert Wyatt were originally scheduled to participate; however, Winwood withdrew because he could not find sufficient time to attend rehearsals, and Wyatt was recovering from a recent falling accident that had left him paralyzed.

Musicians

- Kevin Ayers – bass guitar
- David Bedford – grand piano, accordion, organ, choir director, string arrangements
- Steve Broughton – drums
- Jon Field – flute
- Fred Frith – electric guitar, bass guitar
- John Greaves – Davoli electric piano, Farfisa organ, tin whistle, Vox organ
- Nick Haley – violin
- Tim Hodgkinson – Farfisa organ, Fender Rhodes electric piano, Vox organ
- Steve Hillage – electric guitar
- Simon Ingram Hill – cello, organ
- Geoff Leigh – flute (Note: Leigh was misspelled as "Jeff Leig" in the concert's official program booklets.)
- Ashley Mason – viola
- Pierre Moerlen – cymbals, glockenspiel, gongs, tam-tam, tubular bells, timpani
- Tom Newman – nasal chorus vocals
- Mike Oldfield – acoustic and electric guitars, bass guitar, Lowrey organ, mandolin, spoken word vocals
- Terry Oldfield – flute
- Ted Speight – electric guitar
- Vivian Stanshall – master of ceremonies
- Mick Taylor – electric guitar
- Janet Townley – violin
- Vulpy – viola
- "Girlie Chorus" backing vocalists: Sarah Greaves, Kathy Williams, Sally Oldfield, Maureen Rossini, Lynette Asquith, Amanda Parsons, Maggie Thomas, Mundy Ellis, Julie Clive, Liz Gluck, Debbie Scott, Hanna Corker

=== BBC studio broadcast ===
Oldfield and many of the musicians who had participated in the Queen Elizabeth Hall concert performed "Part One" again later that year for the BBC arts programme 2nd House. Recorded as a pre-recorded performance in a studio setting without an audience on 30 November 1973, it was broadcast on BBC Two on 5 January 1974.

The arrangement integrated a new part for oboe, performed by Soft Machine's Karl Jenkins, and accompanied on-screen visual captures of tubular steel sculptures and sequences from the film Reflections, both created by sculptor William Pye. The performance film was later preserved, formally released on the Elements (2004) DVD, and included as the visual content layer inside the Deluxe and Ultimate Editions of the 2009 reissue.

Musicians

- Jon Field – flute
- Fred Frith – bass guitar, electric guitar
- John Greaves – keyboards
- Steve Hillage – electric guitar
- Tim Hodgkinson – keyboards
- Karl Jenkins – oboe
- Geoff Leigh – flute
- Pierre Moerlen – percussion (Note: Moerlen was credited under the pseudonym "Pierre de Strasbourg" in the original Radio Times programme listings.)
- Tom Newman – nasal choir vocals, mixing
- Mike Oldfield – bass guitar, electric guitar, Hammond organ
- Terry Oldfield – flute
- Mike Ratledge – keyboards
- Ted Speight – electric guitar, bass guitar
- Mick Taylor – electric guitar
- Choir (uncredited)

== Reissues ==
=== 1973–2001 reissues ===
Tubular Bells has been reissued numerous times across various audio formats since its initial 1973 release. In 1976, a quadraphonic mix was prepared and subsequently bundled into the Boxed compilation box set. The album received its first digital remastering for its CD debut in 1983, followed by a high profile 20th-anniversary remaster in 1993 utilising modern multi-bit analogue-to-digital technology. Virgin Records later selected the title to inaugurate its high-fidelity SACD and HDCD formats in the late 1990s and early 2000s. The core specifications of these historical reissues are summarised below:

Historical reissues (1973–2001)
Year	Format / Edition	Record Label	Technical Features
1975	Quadraphonic mix	Virgin Records	4-channel surround mix later included on Boxed (1976). The first 40,000 copies are not true quadraphonic sound, but doctored versions of the stereo mix. This was corrected on subsequent copies, but there is no indication on the record that this substitution was made.
1983	Standard CD	Virgin Records	First commercial digital CD press
1993	20th Anniversary Edition	Virgin Records	Remastered using 20-bit digital processing technology
1998	25th Anniversary Edition	Virgin Records	Released on 180g gold-plated vinyl and limited HDCD format
2001	SACD edition	Virgin Records	Hybrid Super Audio CD featuring original quadraphonic elements

=== 2009 Mercury reissue ===
In 2008, the rights to Tubular Bells returned to Oldfield's personal control. Following a licensing arrangement signed in 2005, the distribution catalog for Oldfield's foundational Virgin albums transferred to Universal Music Group's Mercury imprint. The resulting overhauled Deluxe Edition was issued on 8 June 2009 across various formats, including vinyl, double-CD, and DVD package variations. The core release carried a new stereo mix engineered by Oldfield in March 2009 at his home studio in Nassau, Bahamas. The tracking configurations paired a specialised 5.1 surround sound mix with the Deluxe Edition, while the Ultimate Edition box set included an accompanying 60-page hardback book and replica archival studio memorabilia.

The product launch was promoted globally via a coordinated series of synchronised public bell-ringing events staged at 6:00 pm on 6 June 2009, an intentional alphanumeric wordplay referencing the Number of the beast. A central promotional event was hosted at the British Music Experience—then located at The O_{2} in London—and featured a performance by the Handbell Ringers of Great Britain alongside an ambient electronic DJ set by the Orb titled "Orbular Bells". The venue concurrently held dedicated interactive handbell chiming workshops and public performance competitions. The 2009 reissue entered the UK Albums Chart, peaking at number 11.

=== 2023 50th Anniversary reissue ===
On 26 May 2023, a comprehensive 50th Anniversary Edition of the album was released on CD and half-speed mastered double-vinyl formats. The package paired a new master of the original 1973 audio tape with several bonus cuts, including the live arrangement from the 2012 Summer Olympics opening ceremony and the 2013 collaborative remix album with German electronic duo YORK titled Tubular Beats.

The release notably included an unreleased eight-minute demo titled "Tubular Bells 4 Intro", which Oldfield had compiled in 2017 before abandoning plans for a fourth full-length direct studio sequel. Label communications published alongside the product launch indicated that the piece "may well be the last piece ever to be recorded by Oldfield".

Concurrently, a Blu-ray audio version was issued as an exclusive through Super Deluxe Edition. This release features a new Dolby Atmos mix and a new stereo mix by producer David Kosten, paired with Oldfield's 2009 5.1 surround sound mix and the archival 1975 quadraphonic mix engineered by Phil Newell.

== Legacy ==
=== The Exorcist ===
The introduction to Part One was chosen to feature in the 1973 horror film The Exorcist. According to the British film critic Mark Kermode, the decision to include the music was the result of chance – the director, William Friedkin, had decided to discard the original score by Lalo Schifrin and was looking for music to replace it. Friedkin was visiting the offices of Ahmet Ertegun, the president of Atlantic Records (which distributed Tubular Bells in the US), and picking up a white label record from the selection of records in Ertegun's office, he put it on the record player and instantly decided that the music would be perfect for the film. Although the introduction only features briefly in two scenes, it has become the track most commonly associated with the film. Oldfield said he did not want to see the film because he believed he would find it too frightening.

=== Sequels and other albums ===
Tubular Bells remains the album most identified with Oldfield, and he has released three sequels. Tubular Bells II was released in 1992 which, like its predecessor, reached number 1 in the UK. It was followed by the electronic and dance-oriented Tubular Bells III (1998) and The Millennium Bell (1999). On the thirtieth anniversary of Tubular Bells, Oldfield re-recorded the original Tubular Bells with contemporary technology, making several corrections to what he saw as flaws in the original production. Since Stanshall died in 1995, the re-recording features new narration provided by actor John Cleese. Tubular Bells 2003 went to number 51 in the UK.

In 1975, an orchestral arrangement of the original album was released as The Orchestral Tubular Bells.

Compilations:

- The Best of Tubular Bells (2001)
- The Complete Tubular Bells (2003)

Oldfield and York's 2013 remix album Tubular Beats contains two remixes of sections of Tubular Bells.

=== Virgin Group ===
"I never thought that the word 'tubular bells' was going to play such an important part in our lives ... Virgin going into space most likely wouldn't have existed if we hadn't hired that particular instrument."

— Richard Branson, 2013

Richard Branson recognised the significance of Tubular Bells to the Virgin Group's success, who named one of his first Virgin America aircraft, an Airbus A319-112, N527VA Tubular Belle. Prior to this Virgin Atlantic had named a Boeing 747-4Q8, G-VHOT Tubular Belle, in 1994.

In the United Kingdom Virgin Money signalled its entry into the banking sector in January 2012 with a television advertisement titled '40 Years of Better'. The advertisement opened with an image of a record orbiting the Earth accompanied by the music of the introduction to Tubular Bells, signifying the beginnings of Virgin, and ended with a shot of the same record framed and hanging on the wall of the new bank. Two months later a Virgin Media TV advertisement starring Branson and actor David Tennant also featured the record, where a younger version of Branson is seen holding a copy of Tubular Bells under his arm upon exiting a time machine. However, the advert was withdrawn shortly afterwards following objections from the BBC that it was being used to endorse a rival TV service (in the advert Tennant is shown searching on Virgin's TiVo on-demand service for episodes of Doctor Who, a BBC series in which he formerly played the titular character).

In May 2021, Virgin Orbit, the commercial rocket launch provider subsidiary of the Virgin Group, announced the first operational mission of their LauncherOne air-launched rocket was named after the first track, Tubular Bells, Part One.

=== Cultural references ===
The use of the opening theme in the 1973 film The Exorcist gained the record considerable publicity and introduced the work to a broader audience. Along with a number of other Oldfield pieces the theme was used in the 1979 NASA movie The Space Movie. It has gained cultural significance as a "haunting theme", partly due to the association with The Exorcist, and has been sampled by many other artists.

In television it was used in several episodes of the Dutch children's series Bassie en Adriaan, and an episode ("Ghosts") of the BBC series My Family. It was used in a television advertisement for the Volkswagen Golf Diesel in 2002 and in various films.

=== Computer tie-ins ===
With the aid of the software house CRL, Mike Oldfield released an interactive Commodore 64 version in 1986, which used the SID sound chip to play back a simplified re-arrangement, accompanied by some simple 2D visual effects. The interactivity was limited to controlling the speed and quantity of the visual effects, tuning the sound's volume and filtering, and skipping to any part of the album.

In 2004, Oldfield launched a virtual reality project, Maestro, which contains music from Tubular Bells 2003. The original title was The Tube World. This was the second game which was released under the MusicVR banner, the first being Tres Lunas. MusicVR set out to be a real-time virtual reality experience combining imagery and music, as a non-violent and essentially a non-goal driven game.

In 2012 Universal and Indaba Music created a Tubular Bells remix contest, where users could download original stem recordings to create their own pieces and the winner of the $1,000 prize was judged by Oldfield.

=== 2012 Olympic Games ===
On 27 July 2012 at the 2012 Summer Olympics opening ceremony Mike Oldfield performed during a segment about the NHS and children’s literature. 600 dancers, all of whom were NHS staff, along with 1,200 volunteers recruited from British hospitals, along with people from the Great Ormond Street Hospital, entered along with children on 320 hospital beds, some of which functioned as trampolines. The show's director Danny Boyle stated that he had wanted to make Tubular Bells a "cornerstone" of a 20-minute sequence of the ceremony. A studio version of Oldfield's performance appears on the soundtrack album Isles of Wonder. Although listed as "Tubular Bells"/"In Dulci Jubilo", the track consists of a number of parts, the first being the introduction piece to his Tubular Bells in its normal arrangement, then this is followed by a rearranged version of that same theme that during interviews Oldfield has called "swingular bells". The piece that is used when children's literature villains appear features two arrangements of "Far Above the Clouds" (from Tubular Bells III), and finally as the Mary Poppins characters appear to drive off the villains, there is a rendition of "In Dulci Jubilo" followed by a short coda.

The Olympics version was released as a 500-copy limited edition pink/blue vinyl single on 8 October 2012. This was also released on iTunes as "Tubular Bells/In Dulci Julio (Music from the Opening Ceremony of the London 2012 Olympic Games)" as well as on the official 2012 Olympics album. In 2023, this rendition appeared on the 50th anniversary release of Tubular Bells.

This lists the movements as:

1. "Tubular Bells (Part One Excerpt)"
2. "Tubular Bells (Part One Swing)"
3. "Tubular Bells (Part Two Excerpt)"
4. "Tubular Bells III (Far Above the Clouds)"
5. "Mary Poppins Arrival"
6. "Fanfare for the Isles of Wonder"
7. "In Dulci Jubilo"
8. "Olympic Tubular Bells Coda"

== Adaptations ==
American artist Tori Amos has frequently used the opening Tubular Bells theme in her live shows. It began during the 1996 Dew Drop Inn Tour where she let "Father Lucifer" segue into Tubular Bells on the piano while singing words from Bronski Beat's "Smalltown Boy" as well as playing it on the harpsichord during songs "Love Song" (a Cure cover) and "Bells for Her" (from the album Under the Pink), usually while mixing in lyrics from a third song such as Björk's "Hyperballad" or "Blue Skies". It appeared again in 2005 as part of "Yes, Anastasia", and on the 2007 tour promoting her album American Doll Posse where it was performed with full band as an intro to "Devils and Gods". On the 2011 tour, promoting her album Night of Hunters it is being performed as the intro to and backing melody for "God."

Tubular Bells for Two is a music-theatre production created by two Australian multi-instrumentalists, Aidan Roberts and Daniel Holdsworth, in 2009. The two musicians perform over twenty instruments to recreate the original album 'as faithfully as physically possible'. The show won a Sydney Fringe Award for Best Musical Moment in the 2010 Festival, and has been performed at festivals around Australia and the Pacific. The show made its European debut at the Edinburgh Festival Fringe in 2012, where it won two awards.

In 2013, Oldfield invited Branson to the opening of St. Andrew's International School of The Bahamas, where two of Oldfield's children were pupils. This was the occasion of the debut of Tubular Bells for Schools, a piano solo adaptation of Oldfield's work.

== Track listing ==
Side one
No.	Title	Writer(s)	Length
1.	"Tubular Bells, Part One"	Mike Oldfield	25:30
Total length:			25:30

Side two
No.	Title	Writer(s)	Length
1.	"Tubular Bells, Part Two" (Includes "The Sailor's Hornpipe")	Oldfield, Traditional (arr. Oldfield)	23:22
Total length:			23:22

== Personnel ==
Credits are adapted from the album's sleeve notes.

=== Musicians ===
- Mike Oldfield – acoustic guitar, bass guitar, electric guitar (including "speed guitar", "fuzz guitar", "mandolin-like guitar", and "guitars sounding like bagpipes"), grand piano, glockenspiel, Farfisa organ, taped motor drive amplifier organ chord, assorted percussion, flageolet, honky tonk piano, Lowrey organ, concert timpani, Hammond organ, Spanish guitar, vocals ("Piltdown Man" and "Moribund chorus"), tubular bells
- Steve Broughton – drums on "Part Two"
- Lindsay L. Cooper – string basses
- Jon Field – flutes
- Mundy Ellis – backing vocals ("Girlie Chorus")
- Sally Oldfield – backing vocals ("Girlie Chorus")
- Vivian Stanshall – Master of Ceremonies on "Part One"
- Nasal Choir – uncredited studio staff
- Bootleg Chorus – the Manor Choir (conducted by Mike Oldfield)

=== Production ===
- Mike Oldfield – producer, 2009 stereo and 5.1 surround sound mix
- Simon Heyworth – producer, engineer, mastering engineer
- Tom Newman – producer, engineer
- Trevor Key – sleeve design, photography

== Charts ==
=== Weekly charts ===
Weekly chart performance for Tubular Bells
Chart (1973–1975)	Peak position
Australian Albums (Kent Music Report)	1
Canada Albums (RPM)	1
Dutch Albums (Album Top 100)	2
German Albums (Offizielle Top 100)	37
New Zealand Albums (RMNZ)	25
Spanish Albums (PROMUSICAE)	4
UK Albums (Official Charts)	1
US Billboard 200	3
US Cash Box Top 100	1

2006 weekly chart performance for Tubular Bells
Chart (2006)	Peak position
Spanish Albums (Promusicae)	86

Weekly chart performance for Tubular Bells 50th anniversary edition
Chart (2023)	Peak position
Austrian Albums (Ö3 Austria)	67
Belgian Albums (Ultratop Flanders)	126
Belgian Albums (Ultratop Wallonia)	87
German Albums (Offizielle Top 100)	22
Polish Albums (ZPAV)	89
Scottish Albums (Official Charts)	3
Spanish Albums (Promusicae)	13
Swiss Albums (Schweizer Hitparade)	21
UK Album Downloads (Official Charts)	19
UK Progressive Albums (Official Charts)	4
UK Rock & Metal Albums (Official Charts)	1

=== Year-end charts ===
1974 year-end chart performance for Tubular Bells
Chart (1974)	Position
Australian Albums (Kent Music Report)	6
Canada Top Albums/CDs (RPM)	36
UK Albums (OCC)	3
US Billboard Pop Albums	22
US Cash Box Albums	17

1975 year-end chart performance for Tubular Bells
Chart (1975)	Position
Dutch Charts (MegaCharts)	5
UK Albums (OCC)	7

1976 year-end chart performance for Tubular Bells
Chart (1976)	Position
UK Albums (OCC)	27

1977 year-end chart performance for Tubular Bells
Chart (1977)	Position
UK Albums (OCC)	49

=== Decade-end charts ===
Decade-end chart performance for Tubular Bells
Chart (1970–1979)	Position
UK Albums (OCC)	3

== Certifications and sales ==
Certifications and sales for Tubular Bells
Region	Certification	Certified units/sales
Australia (ARIA)	3× Platinum	730,000
Canada (Music Canada)	2× Platinum	200,000^{^}
France (SNEP)	Gold	250,000
Netherlands (NVPI)	Gold	50,000^{^}
Sweden (GLF)	Gold	50,000^{^}
United Kingdom (BPI)	9× Platinum	2,760,000
United States (RIAA)	Gold	3,000,000
Summaries
Worldwide	—	15,000,000
^{^} Shipments figures based on certification alone.
