= Moonlight Shadow: The Collection =

Compilation album by Mike Oldfield
- Released: 22 April 2013; 2019 (vinyl)
- Recorded: 1973 – 2008
- Genre: Pop rock, progressive rock
- Length: 75:36
- Label: Spectrum Music
- Producer: Mike Oldfield, Tom Newman, Simon Heyworth, Simon Phillips, Karl Jenkins

Mike Oldfield chronology
Icon (2012)	Moonlight Shadow: The Collection (2013)	The 1984 Suite (2016)

Moonlight Shadow: The Collection is a compilation album by British multi-instrumentalist Mike Oldfield. It was released on 22 April 2013 in the United Kingdom. The title is from Oldfield and Maggie Reilly's 1983 song "Moonlight Shadow" which topped many European charts.

The album includes selections from Oldfield's recorded output with Mercury Records. Pieces from earlier in Oldfield's career were originally released on Virgin Records but have been subsequently moved to Mercury/Universal Music. It was Universal's third Oldfield compilation album in two years.

In 2019 a vinyl with a different track listing was issued with the same title and artwork.

== Track listing ==
=== 2013 CD release ===
No.	Title	Writer(s)	Original album	Length
1.	"Tubular Bells" (Two Sides excerpt)	Mike Oldfield	Tubular Bells, 1973	13:28
2.	"Ommadawn" (Excerpt)	Oldfield	Ommadawn, 1975	3:37
3.	"In Dulci Jubilo"	Johann Sebastian Bach, Robert Lucas Pearsall	Non-album single, 1975	2:50
4.	"First Excursion"	David Bedford, Oldfield	B-side to the "William Tell Overture" single, 1977	5:52
5.	"Diana" (Excerpt from "Incantations")	Oldfield	Incantations, 1978	6:32
6.	"Platinum" (Part One - Airborn)	Oldfield	Platinum, 1979	5:00
7.	"Guilty" (7" single version)	Oldfield	Non-album single, 1979	4:13
8.	"Blue Peter"	Herbert Ashworth-Hope	Non-album single, 1979	2:05
9.	"Sheba"	Oldfield	QE2, 1980	3:31
10.	"Mount Teidi"	Oldfield	Five Miles Out, 1982	4:10
11.	"Moonlight Shadow"	Oldfield	Crises, 1983	3:37
12.	"Good News"	Oldfield	The Killing Fields, 1984	1:44
13.	"Amarok" (Part one) (Two Sides excerpt)	Oldfield	Amarok, 1990	5:03
14.	"Slipstream"	Oldfield	Light + Shade, 2005	5:14
15.	"Sunset"	Oldfield	Light + Shade	4:42
16.	"Aurora"	Oldfield	Music of the Spheres, 2008	3:43

=== 2019 Vinyl release ===
Side one
No.	Title	Writer(s)	Original album	Length
1.	"Tubular Bells" (Two Sides excerpt)	Oldfield	Tubular Bells, 1973
2.	"Amarok" (Part one) (Two Sides excerpt)	Oldfield	Amarok, 1990
3.	"Mike Oldfield's Stream" (Theme from Return to Ommadawn Part One)	Oldfield	Return to Ommadawn, 2017

Side two
No.	Title	Writer(s)	Original album	Length
4.	"Moonlight Shadow"	Oldfield	Crises, 1983
5.	"Sailing"	Oldfield	Man on the Rocks, 2014
6.	"Slipstream"	Oldfield	Light + Shade, 2005
7.	"Guilty"	Oldfield	Non-album single, 1979
8.	"Good News"	Oldfield	The Killing Fields, 1984
9.	"In Dulce Jubilo"	Bach, Pearsall	Non-album single, 1975
