= Billy Bunter of Greyfriars School (TV series) =

British TV series (1952–1961)

- Opening title
- Starring: Gerald Campion; Anthony Valentine; Michael Crawford; John Woodnutt; Jeremy Bulloch; Melvyn Hayes; Kenneth Cope; Roger Delgado
- Country of origin: United Kingdom
- Original language: English
- No. of series: 7
- No. of episodes: 52 (43 missing)

Production
- Producers: Joy Harington; Shaun Sutton; Pharic Maclaren; David Goddard; Clive Parkhurst
- Production locations: Esher Station, Esher, Surrey, United Kingdom
- Running time: 30 minutes

Original release
- Network: BBC Television
- Release: 19 February 1952 – 22 July 1961

Billy Bunter of Greyfriars School is a BBC Television show broadcast from 1952 to 1961. It was based on the Greyfriars School stories, written by author Charles Hamilton under the pen name Frank Richards. Hamilton wrote all of the scripts for the television show.

Bunter was portrayed by actor Gerald Campion, who was aged 29 when he was cast in the role in 1952, hence was playing a schoolboy only half his age. A number of genuine child actors were featured in the other schoolboy roles in the show, some of whom would gain notice in their subsequent adult careers, including Anthony Valentine, Michael Crawford, Jeremy Bulloch, Melvyn Hayes and Kenneth Cope. Only 9 of the show's 52 episodes are known to exist.

== Development ==
The character Billy Bunter featured in stories about the fictional Greyfriars School which appeared for over 30 years (in fact, continuously from 1908 to 1940) in the boys' comic The Magnet, written mainly by author Charles Hamilton (although, as Hamilton was not always the author, the stories were published under the collective pen-name 'Frank Richards'). Plans to bring the stories to the cinema screen, featuring the comedian Will Hay as Bunter's form master Henry Samuel Quelch (based on his previous stage and film portrayals as a schoolmaster), had been discussed in the 1930s, but were unrealised. In January 1947, the Daily Mail newspaper reported that the Rank Organisation and Rock Productions were interested in resurrecting the film project, with the latter paying a £150 fee to Charles Hamilton, but again the project was dropped.

In May 1951, the BBC Children's Department made public its plans to screen a series of half-hour television shows featuring Billy Bunter as the principal character. These would be broadcast during Children's Hour. Later that year, in December 1951, the BBC announced that it was looking for an actor to portray the character of Bunter, prompting seventy-five hopefuls to apply for the part. The search for a suitable actor received wide newspaper coverage, with the Daily Mirror covering the auditions both on its front page and in columnist Ian Mackey's 'diary'. The Daily Telegraph and Reynolds News were among other newspapers that also provided prominent coverage. When a 29-year-old actor, Gerald Campion, who was married with two children, was cast in the role of Bunter, a 15-year-old schoolboy, the choice was greeted with mixed reactions. Apart from the matter of his age, Campion, although fairly short and somewhat rotund, was a relative lightweight at 11 stone 2 pounds (70.8 kg), compared with Bunter's weight of 14 stone 12 1/2 lb (94.5 kg) (as described in The Magnet in 1939), and this added to the controversy (for the television series, Campion would wear padding to make him appear much fatter than he actually was). In fact Campion had already been considered for the role of Bunter, twelve years earlier, when the intention was to make a cinema film based on the character.

Veteran character actor Kynaston Reeves was cast as schoolmaster Mr Quelch (and would play Quelch in four of the seven series, as the only recurring member of the main cast apart from Campion himself), with various unknown child actors cast in the roles of the various schoolboys. As the show continued into successive series over the following nine years, the schoolboy roles would be recast regularly as Campion's youthful co-stars aged beyond the putative ages of their characters. A number of the young actors later carved out successful acting careers as adults, including Anthony Valentine (cast as Lord Mauleverer and, later, as form captain Harry Wharton), Michael Crawford (as Frank Nugent), Jeremy Bulloch (as Bob Cherry), Melvyn Hayes (as the cad Harold Skinner), and Kenneth Cope (as school bully Gerald Loder).

Being set in a school, albeit a public school, the show was a production of the BBC's Children's Department rather than the Drama Department, and was aimed at a youthful audience. Accordingly, its first producer was Joy Harington, who had also produced an adaptation of Richmal Crompton's Just William stories, and of Robert Louis Stevenson's children's novel Treasure Island, among other children's shows. Later episodes were produced by Shaun Sutton, who would eventually become a long serving head of television drama for the BBC. The programme was made on a small budget.

Artist Tony Hart, who would later become well known as the presenter of TV shows Vision On, Playbox and Take Hart, provided the artwork for the opening credits. The theme music was the "Portsmouth" section of Ralph Vaughan Williams's Sea Songs.

The earliest episodes were live performances, broadcast in two timeslots: at 5:40 pm (during children's programmes), and a repeat performance was given live the same evening at 8:00 pm, during family viewing when parents and children might watch together.

Many of the television scripts are adaptations, based on the Greyfriars novels featuring Bunter which Charles Hamilton wrote during the 1950s: more than three dozen such novels appeared in print between 1948 and 1965, and many of the television scripts bear titles which echo those of particular books. Indeed, a succession of TV episodes – Lord Billy Bunter and Bunter's Christmas Party among many others – were aired under exactly the same title as the novel they were based on. Titles, plots, characters, even dialogue, were lifted wholesale from each novel – by the original author – and aired as a thirty-minute condensed TV adaptation of that novel.

== Reception ==
"Bunter on TV seems to have roused a lot of comment. For myself I can only repeat that I like it very much indeed. If it isn't quite perfect, is anything in this imperfect world? I just love watching the plays, and wish they would go on for ever."

— Charles Hamilton (1952)

Reaction to the first episode of the show was mixed. Jonah Barrington, radio critic of the Sunday Chronicle provided the doubled-edged observation that Bunter was the greatest TV character since Muffin the Mule. Newspaper reviewers generally agreed that the casting of Gerald Campion as Bunter and character actor Kynaston Reeves as Mr Quelch were successful – although some dissenters felt that Reeves' interpretation was closer to Upper Fourth master Mr Hacker than Mr Quelch.

The portrayal of the senior boys was generally viewed as adequate, but most reviewers agreed that the portrayal of the junior schoolboys was much less successful. The characters of Hurree Singh and Bob Cherry were seen as particularly poorly realised, with both woodenly parroting their familiar catch-phrases without the slightest expression.

The low budget of the production also attracted adverse comment, with reviewers noting a "certain emptiness of the sets" and the fact that the school seemed deserted apart from the principal characters.

The show did not lose its popularity over its nine years on the air. If anything, it gained in popularity and ratings as time went by, resulting in later seasons comprising greater numbers of episodes. It eventually came to an end due only to the death, in December 1961 at the age of 85, of Charles Hamilton, who had created the character of Bunter and who wrote all of the televised scripts over the entire nine years.

Gerald Campion's last ever broadcast in the role of Billy Bunter occurred in July 1994, as part of a BBC Radio 4 series of spoof documentaries examining the careers of famous fictional characters, entitled Whatever Happened To ..., in which Campion appeared as Lord Bunter of Hove in the 4th programme of the series, which examined the later career of Horace Henry Samuel Quelch.

== Archive ==
Almost all episodes have been lost. Nine episodes exist today as telerecordings. The survivors are the complete third series (six episodes), and three isolated subsequent episodes. Some audio-only recordings also exist, in private hands. No recordings of the first series or the 1953 special are thought to have ever existed, as they were live broadcasts before telerecording was fully utilised by the BBC.

The Series 7 episode 3 edition (aired 3 June 1961), entitled Double Bunter, survives because a 16mm film print of the episode was presented by the BBC to Gerald Campion upon the series ending, as it was an episode he particularly liked (because the script called on him to play two characters, not merely Bunter), so that many years later his family were able to loan it to BBC Archives – an organisation which didn't exist in 1961.

A common source of confusion is that early episodes for which no recording existed were remade by later producers, using different casts, probably due to difficulties in obtaining new scripts from the ailing Charles Hamilton. In the last two years of Hamilton's life, the show's final producer, Clive Parkhurst, embarked on a policy of remaking the earliest scripts on a wholesale basis, and ultimately abandoned the school setting entirely: in the very last episodes, at the suggestion of Campion, filming new scripts from other writers that sent Bunter off on a Mediterranean holiday cruise (initially as a stowaway) to Egypt, Italy and France.

Campion and a BBC film crew travelled to Malta to film location footage around the Mediterranean, for a sequence of episodes in which Lord Mauleverer lends his yacht, and takes a party of schoolboys (including Bunter), under the supervision of Mr Quelch, touring various holiday attractions.

== Principal characters and cast ==
| Name | Portrayed by | Series 1 (1952) | 1953/1954 Specials | Series 2 (1955) | Series 3 (1956) | 1957 Special | Series 4 (1957) | Series 5 (1959) | Series 6 (1960) | Series 7 (1961) |
|---|---|---|---|---|---|---|---|---|---|---|
| Billy Bunter | Gerald Campion | 6 | 2 | 6 | 6 | 1 | 5 | 9 | 8 | 9 |
| Mr Quelch | Kynaston Reeves | 5 | 1 | | 3 | | 4 | | | |
| Mr Quelch | Raf De La Torre | | | 6 | | | | | | |
| Mr Quelch | John Woodnutt | | | | | | | 9 | | |
| Mr Quelch | Jack Melford | | | | | | | | 1 | 3 |
| Harry Wharton | John Charlesworth | 6 | | 6 | | | | | | |
| Harry Wharton | Henry Searle | | 1 | | | | | | | |
| Harry Wharton | Anthony Valentine | | | | 3 | | 5 | | | |
| Harry Wharton | Richard Palmer | | | | | | | 9 | | |
| Harry Wharton | Julian Yardley | | | | | | | | 1 | 3 |
| Frank Nugent | Michael Danvers-Walker | 6 | 1 | | | | | | | |
| Frank Nugent | Peter Marden | | | 6 | | | | | | |
| Frank Nugent | Laurence Harrington | | | | 3 | | 5 | | | |
| Frank Nugent | Michael Crawford | | | | | | | 9 | | |
| Bob Cherry | Keith Faulkner | 6 | | | | | 5 | | | |
| Bob Cherry | Brian Smith | | 1 | | | | | | | |
| Bob Cherry | Brian Roper | | | 6 | 3 | | | | | |
| Bob Cherry | Cavan Kendall | | | | | | | 9 | | |
| Bob Cherry | Peter Greenspan | | | | | | | | 1 | |
| Bob Cherry | Jeremy Bulloch | | | | | | | | | 3 |
| Hurree Jamset Ram Singh | David Spenser | 6 | | | | | | | | |
| Hurree Jamset Ram Singh | Ronald Moody | | 1 | 6 | | | | | | |
| Hurree Jamset Ram Singh | James Doran | | | | | | 5 | | | |
| Hurree Jamset Ram Singh | Leonard Davey | | | | | | | 9 | | |
| Hurree Jamset Ram Singh | Brian Tipping | | | | | | | | 1 | |
| Hurree Jamset Ram Singh | Hugh Ward | | | | | | | | | 3 |
| Johnny Bull | Barry MacGregor | 6 | 1 | | | | | | | |
| Johnny Bull | Colin Campbell | | | 6 | | | | | | |
| Johnny Bull | David Coote | | | | 3 | | 5 | | | |
| Johnny Bull | Nigel Anthony | | | | | | | 9 | | |
| Johnny Bull | Melvin Baker | | | | | | | | 1 | |
| Johnny Bull | Gregory Warwick | | | | | | | | | 3 |
| Harold Skinner | Philip Guard | 2 | | | | | | | | |
| Harold Skinner | Henry Davies | | | 2 | | | | | | |
| Harold Skinner | Melvyn Hayes | | | | 2 | | 1 | | | |
| Harold Skinner | Barry Halliday | | | | | | | | 1 | 1 |
| Lord Mauleverer | Cavan Malone | 1 | | | | | | | | |
| Lord Mauleverer | Anthony Valentine | | | 4 | | | | | | |
| Lord Mauleverer | Glyn Dearman | | | | 1 | | 1 | | | |
| Lord Mauleverer | Malcolm Gerard | | | | | | | | | 1 |
| Herbert Vernon-Smith | Robin Willott | | | | | | 1 | | | |
| Gerald Loder | Kenneth Cope | | | 1 | 1 | | | | | |
| Horace Coker | Miles Brown | 1 | 1 | | | | | | | |
| Horace Coker | Peter Scott | | | | 1 | | 2 | | | |
| Horace Coker | Michael Caridia | | | | | | | 2 | | |
| Horace Coker | Ian Hobbs | | | | | | | | | 1 |

== Episodes ==
=== Series 1 (1952) ===
| No. | Title | Produced by | Written by | Original release date | In BBC archive? |
|---|---|---|---|---|---|
| 1 | "The Siege" | Joy Harington | Frank Richards | 19 February 1952 | No |
| 2 | "The Report" | Joy Harington | Frank Richards | 26 February 1952 | No |
| 3 | "Bunter's Christmas Party" | Joy Harington | Frank Richards | 4 March 1952 | No |
| 4 | "Bunter's Postal Order" | Joy Harington | Frank Richards | 11 March 1952 | No |
| 5 | "Bunter's Bicycle" | Joy Harington | Frank Richards | 18 March 1952 | No |
| 6 | "A Piece of Cake" | Joy Harington | Frank Richards | 25 March 1952 | No |

=== 1953 & 1954 Specials ===
| No. | Title | Produced by | Written by | Original release date | In BBC archive? |
|---|---|---|---|---|---|
| 7 | "Billy Bunter of Greyfriars School" | Joy Harington | Frank Richards | 7 July 1953 | No |
| 8 | "Bunter Won't Go" | Joy Harington | Frank Richards | 1 July 1954 | No |

=== Series 2 (1955) ===
| No. | Title | Produced by | Written by | Original release date | In BBC archive? |
|---|---|---|---|---|---|
| 9 | "Bunter on the Run" | Joy Harington | Frank Richards | 9 July 1955 | No |
| 10 | "Bunter the Hypnotist" | Joy Harington | Frank Richards | 23 July 1955 | No |
| 11 | "Lord Billy Bunter" | Joy Harington | Frank Richards | 6 August 1955 | No |
| 12 | "Bunter Forgot" | Joy Harington | Frank Richards | 20 August 1955 | No |
| 13 | "Bunter takes the Blame" | Joy Harington | Frank Richards | 3 September 1955 | No |
| 14 | "Bunter Knows How" | Joy Harington | Frank Richards | 17 September 1955 | No |

=== Series 3 (1956) ===
| No. | Title | Produced by | Written by | Original release date | In BBC archive? |
|---|---|---|---|---|---|
| 15 | "Backing Up Bunter" | Shaun Sutton | Frank Richards | 9 September 1956 | Yes |
| 16 | "Bunter the Bold" | Shaun Sutton | Frank Richards | 16 September 1956 | Yes |
| 17 | "Billy Bunter's Double" | Shaun Sutton | Frank Richards | 23 September 1956 | Yes |
| 18 | "Hunting Bunter" | Shaun Sutton | Frank Richards | 30 September 1956 | Yes |
| 19 | "Bunter on the Warpath" | Shaun Sutton | Frank Richards | 7 October 1956 | Yes |
| 20 | "Bunter's Christmas Box" | Shaun Sutton | Frank Richards | 14 October 1956 | Yes |

=== 1957 Special ===
| No. | Title | Produced by | Written by | Original release date | In BBC archive? |
|---|---|---|---|---|---|
| 21 | "Bull's-Eye for Bunter" | Douglas Fleming | Frank Richards | 12 March 1957 | No |

=== Series 4 (1957) ===
| No. | Title | Produced by | Written by | Original release date | In BBC archive? |
|---|---|---|---|---|---|
| 22 | "Beastly For Bunter" | Pharic Maclaren | Frank Richards | 20 July 1957 | No |
| 23 | "Bunter The Ventriloquist" | Pharic Maclaren | Frank Richards | 3 August 1957 | No |
| 24 | "Bad Lad Bunter!" | Pharic Maclaren | Frank Richards | 10 August 1957 | No |
| 25 | "Bunter Keeps It Dark" | Pharic Maclaren | Frank Richards | 17 August 1957 | No |
| 26 | "Bunter Does His Best" | Pharic Maclaren | Frank Richards | 31 August 1957 | No |

=== Series 5 (1959) ===
| No. | Title | Produced by | Written by | Original release date | In BBC archive? |
|---|---|---|---|---|---|
| 27 | "Bunter's Bargain" | David Goddard | Frank Richards | 13 June 1959 | No |
| 28 | "Billy Bunter's Burglar" | David Goddard | Frank Richards | 27 June 1959 | Yes |
| 29 | "Phoney Bunter" | David Goddard | Frank Richards | 11 July 1959 | No |
| 30 | "Bunter's Birching" | David Goddard | Frank Richards | 18 July 1959 | No |
| 31 | "Bunter Spells Trouble" | David Goddard | Frank Richards | 1 August 1959 | No |
| 32 | "Boastful Bunter" | David Goddard | Frank Richards | 3 August 1959 | No |
| 33 | "Bunter's Bedtime Story" | David Goddard | Frank Richards | 8 August 1959 | No |
| 34 | "Bunter's Bull's Eye" | David Goddard | Frank Richards | 15 August 1959 | No |
| 35 | "Treasure Hunter Bunter" | David Goddard | Frank Richards | 29 August 1959 | No |

=== Series 6 (1960) ===
| No. | Title | Produced by | Written by | Original release date | In BBC archive? |
|---|---|---|---|---|---|
| 36 | "Bunter the Hypnotist" | Clive Parkhurst | Frank Richards | 16 July 1960 | No |
| 37 | "Brainy Bunter" | Clive Parkhurst | Frank Richards | 30 July 1960 | No |
| 38 | "Bunter Knows How" | Clive Parkhurst | Frank Richards | 13 August 1960 | No |
| 39 | "Lord Billy Bunter" | Clive Parkhurst | Frank Richards | 20 August 1960 | No |
| 40 | "Bunter's Bicycle" | Clive Parkhurst | Frank Richards | 27 August 1960 | No |
| 41 | "Toffee Hunter Bunter" | Clive Parkhurst | Frank Richards | 10 September 1960 | No |
| 42 | "Bunter Won't Go" | Clive Parkhurst | Frank Richards | 17 September 1960 | Yes |
| 43 | "Bunter's Party" | Clive Parkhurst | Frank Richards | 24 September 1960 | No |

=== Series 7 (1961) ===
| No. | Title | Produced by | Written by | Original release date | In BBC archive? |
|---|---|---|---|---|---|
| 44 | "Backing Up Bunter" | Clive Parkhurst | Frank Richards | 20 May 1961 | No |
| 45 | "Bold Bunter" | Clive Parkhurst | Frank Richards | 27 May 1961 | No |
| 46 | "Double Bunter" | Clive Parkhurst | Frank Richards | 3 June 1961 | Yes |
| 47 | "Hunting Bunter" | Clive Parkhurst | Frank Richards | 10 June 1961 | No |
| 48 | "Stowaway Bunter" | Clive Parkhurst | Frank Richards | 17 June 1961 | No |
| 49 | "Bunter Goes to Cairo" | Clive Parkhurst | Frank Richards | 24 June 1961 | No |
| 50 | "Bunter Goes to Venice" | Clive Parkhurst | Frank Richards | 1 July 1961 | No |
| 51 | "Bunter Goes to Naples" | Clive Parkhurst | Frank Richards | 15 July 1961 | No |
| 52 | "Bunter Goes to Nice" | Clive Parkhurst | Frank Richards | 22 July 1961 | No |

== Bibliography ==
- Hamilton-Wright, Una. (2006), The Far Side of Billy Bunter – The Biography of Charles Hamilton, Wokingham: The Friars Library.
- Lofts, W.O.G.; Adley, D.J. (1975), The World of Frank Richards, London: Howard Baker.
