= Icon (Mike Oldfield album) =

Compilation album by Mike Oldfield
- Released: 31 May 2012
- Recorded: 1973 – 2007
- Genre: Pop rock, Progressive rock
- Length: 55:35
- Label: Universal Music Enterprises
- Producer: Mike Oldfield, Tom Newman, Simon Heyworth, Simon Phillips, Karl Jenkins

Mike Oldfield chronology
Two Sides (2012)	Icon (2012)	Moonlight Shadow: The Collection (2013)

Icon is a compilation album by British multi-instrumentalist Mike Oldfield. It was released on 31 May 2012 in Europe. It is part of a series of similar Icon albums released by Universal Music Enterprises.

The album includes selections from Oldfield's recorded output with Mercury Records. Pieces from earlier in Oldfield's career were originally released on Virgin Records but have been subsequently moved to Mercury/Universal.

The album was released during the same year as another Mike Oldfield compilation from Universal, Two Sides.

== Track listing ==
No.	Title	Writer(s)	Length
1.	"Tubular Bells" (Original theme from The Exorcist)	Mike Oldfield	3:18
2.	"Moonlight Shadow"	Oldfield	3:39
3.	"In Dulci Jubilo"	Johann Sebastian Bach	2:51
4.	"Spanish Tune"	Oldfield	3:12
5.	"Harbinger"	Oldfield	4:09
6.	"Ommadawn" (Excerpt)	Oldfield	3:39
7.	"The Tempest"	Oldfield	5:49
8.	"Angelique"	Oldfield	4:42
9.	"Family Man"	Oldfield, Tim Cross, Rick Fenn, Mike Frye, Morris Pert, Maggie Reilly	3:46
10.	"Guilty"	Oldfield	6:44
11.	"The Gate"	Oldfield	4:15
12.	"The Sailor's Hornpipe" (Viv Stanshall version)	Traditional	2:49
13.	"Portsmouth"	Traditional	2:01
14.	"Incantations" (Excerpt from part 4)	Oldfield	4:41
