= Take Four =

Single by Mike Oldfield
- Released: 1 December 1978
- Recorded: 1973 – 1978
- Genre: Folk
- Label: Virgin
- Songwriter(s): Traditional; Robert Lucas Pearsall; Tielman Susato
- Producer(s): Mike Oldfield; Tom Newman; Simon Heyworth

Mike Oldfield singles chronology
"Cuckoo Song" (1977)	"Take Four" (1978)	"Guilty" (1979)

"Take Four" is a four-themed single by musician Mike Oldfield, released in 1978. It was Oldfield's first 12-inch single, and was available in white vinyl.

The single featured two of Oldfield's previous singles, "Portsmouth" and "In Dulci Jubilo", along with the finale from Tubular Bells, "The Sailor's Hornpipe", and a new track, "Wrekorder Wrondo" that may be based on the song "Cum decore" by Tielman Susato. Tracks 1, 2 and 3 feature Les Penning on recorders

== Charts ==
It charted at number 72 in the UK Singles Chart.

Chart (1978)	Position
UK Singles Chart	72

== Track listing ==
1. "Portsmouth" – 2:04
2. "In Dulci Jubilo" – 2:51
3. "Wrekorder Wrondo" – 2:31
4. "The Sailor's Hornpipe" – 1:36
