= Boxed (Mike Oldfield album) =

Box set by Mike Oldfield
- Released: 29 October 1976
- Recorded: November 1974 – August 1976 (Collaborations)
- Genre: Progressive rock
- Length: 162:21
- Label: Virgin
- Producers: Mike Oldfield; Peter Jenner; David Bedford; Tom Newman

Mike Oldfield chronology
| Ommadawn (1975) | Boxed (1976) | Incantations (1978) |

Boxed is a 1976 compilation album of music written and performed by Mike Oldfield. It features four channel quadraphonic (SQ system) remix versions of his first three albums:Tubular Bells, Hergest Ridge and Ommadawn. An additional fourth LP contains new musical collaborations with other artists.

Each record is encoded in the SQ Quadraphonic matrix system, which is also compatible with standard two channel stereo playback systems.

== Background ==
Following the release of Ommadawn in October 1975, Virgin Records released Boxed to cover both the gap until the release of Oldfield's next album (Incantations, eventually released in December 1978), and his reluctance to play live.

Oldfield later explained that instead of being true 4-channel sound, the initial quad version of Tubular Bells, released a few months after the stereo version, was a "strange fake out-of-phase system". This was because it was too complex to remix without automation.

The quad remix of Tubular Bells on Boxed was entirely different and true 4-channel sound (later released on SACD). The Boxed-CD version still contains the quadraphonic SQ encoded quad mixes and plays as normal stereo without a quad decoder. The SQ quad remix Hergest Ridge was the only version of the album available on CD (until the 2010 Mercury Records reissue, Deluxe Edition), as Oldfield disliked the original vinyl mix.

The traditional hornpipe melody "The Sailor's Hornpipe", which was the finale from Tubular Bells, has an extended speech from Viv Stanshall, which is from the recording sessions at The Manor Studio (see Tubular Bells original ending). This speech was apparently recorded late one night, or early one morning, when Stanshall and Oldfield returned from the local pub, and Oldfield followed Stanshall round the Manor playing his mandolin, while Stanshall drunkenly described some of the artworks and artefacts to be found in the building.

Tubular Bells was re-mixed in quad by Phil Newell, assisted by Alan Perkins. Hergest Ridge was re-mixed in quad by Mike Oldfield. Ommadawn was re-mixed in quad by Mike Oldfield and Phil Newell.

== Cover ==
The album cover adapts the theme of two M. C. Escher's engravings: "Gallery" and "Other World". The box contained an L.P.-sized booklet showing photos of Oldfield in the studio.

== Charts ==
Boxed charted at number 22 on the UK Album Chart in 1976. In 2009 it also charted on the Billboard European Album Chart at number 76.

| Chart (1976) | Position |
|---|---|
| UK Album Chart | 22 |

| Chart (2009) | Position |
|---|---|
| US Billboard European Album Chart | 76 |

== Track listing ==
=== Vinyl ===
==== LP one – Tubular Bells ====
===== Side one =====
1. "Tubular Bells" Part One (Mike Oldfield) – 25:30

===== Side two =====
1. "Tubular Bells" Part Two (Oldfield except "Sailor's Hornpipe" (Traditional)) – 25:47

==== LP two – Hergest Ridge ====
===== Side three =====
1. "Hergest Ridge" Part One (Oldfield) – 21:24

===== Side four =====
1. "Hergest Ridge" Part Two (Oldfield) – 18:46

==== LP three – Ommadawn ====
===== Side five =====
1. "Ommadawn" Part One (Oldfield) – 20:06

===== Side six =====
1. "Ommadawn" Part Two (Oldfield except "on Horseback"- Mike Oldfield and William Murray) – 17:22

==== LP four – Collaborations ====
===== Side seven =====
1. "The Phaeacian Games" (David Bedford) – 3:59
2. "Extract from Star's End" (Featuring David Bedford, Chris Cutler and The Royal Philharmonic Orchestra) (Bedford) – 7:33
3. "The Rio Grande" (Traditional, arrangement by Bedford) – 6:34

===== Side eight =====
1. "First Excursion" (Oldfield, Bedford) – 5:57
2. "Argiers" (Featuring Leslie Penning) (Traditional, arrangement by Oldfield) – 3:59
3. "Portsmouth" (Featuring Leslie Penning) (Traditional, arrangement by Oldfield) – 2:04
4. "In Dulci Jubilo" (Featuring Leslie Penning and William Murray) (Traditional, arrangement by Oldfield) – 2:51
5. "Speak Tho' You Only Say Farewell" (Featuring David Bedford) (Ray Morello, Horatio Nicholls) – 2:56

=== CD ===
==== Disc 1 ====
1. "Tubular Bells" Part One (Mike Oldfield) – 25:30
2. "Tubular Bells" Part Two (Oldfield except Sailor's Hornpipe (Traditional)) – 25:47
3. "The Rio Grande" (Traditional, arrangement by Bedford) – 6:34
4. "Portsmouth" (Featuring Leslie Penning) (Traditional, arrangement by Oldfield) – 2:04
5. "In Dulci Jubilo" (Featuring Leslie Penning and William Murray) (Traditional, arrangement by Oldfield) – 2:51

==== Disc 2 ====
1. "Hergest Ridge" Part One (Oldfield) – 21:24
2. "Hergest Ridge" Part Two (Oldfield) – 18:46
3. "Extract from Star's End" (Featuring David Bedford, Chris Cutler and The Royal Philharmonic Orchestra) (Bedford) – 7:33
4. "Argiers" (Traditional, arrangement by Oldfield) – 3:59
5. "Speak Tho' You Only Say Farewell" (Featuring Bedford) (Ray Morello, Horatio Nicholls) – 2:56

==== Disc 3 ====
1. "Ommadawn" Part One (Oldfield) – 20:06
2. "Ommadawn" Part Two (Oldfield) – 17:22
3. "The Phaeacian Games" (David Bedford) – 3:59
4. "First Excursion" (Oldfield, Bedford) – 5:57

== Collaborations 2016 release ==
On 2 December 2016, forty years after the original Boxed release, the Collaborations compilation was released on vinyl LP by Universal Records. Cut at Abbey Road by Sean Magee using the original masters, this was the first time that the album had been issued as a standalone release. The LP cover features new artwork from British designer Phil Smee, using the photos of Oldfield jumping shirtless on a trampoline, as featured in the original Boxed booklet.

=== Track listing ===
1. "The Phaeacian Games" (David Bedford) – 3:59
2. "Extract from Star's End" (Featuring David Bedford, Chris Cutler and The Royal Philharmonic Orchestra) (Bedford) – 7:33
3. "The Rio Grande" (Traditional, arrangement by Bedford) – 6:34
4. "First Excursion" (Oldfield, Bedford) – 5:57
5. "Argiers" (Traditional, arrangement by Oldfield) – 3:59
6. "Portsmouth" (Featuring Leslie Penning) (Traditional, arrangement by Oldfield) – 2:04
7. "In Dulci Jubilo" (Featuring Leslie Penning and William Murray) (Traditional, arrangement by Oldfield) – 2:51
8. "Speak Tho' You Only Say Farewell" (Featuring Bedford) (Ray Morello, Horatio Nicholls) – 2:56
