= The Man Who Never Was (disambiguation) =

The Man Who Never Was is a 1956 British film.

The Man Who Never Was may also refer to:

- The nickname for "Major William Martin, RM", a persona created as part of a World War II deception plan
- The Man Who Never Was (book), 1953 book by Ewen Montagu
- The Man Who Never Was (TV series), a 1966 ABC-TV television series
- "The Man Who Never Was" (The Sarah Jane Adventures), the 2011 two-part series finale of The Sarah Jane Adventures
- The Man Who Never Was, a 2016 album by This Winter Machine.
