= Moonlight Shadow (disambiguation) =

"Moonlight Shadow" is a 1983 single by Mike Oldfield.

Moonlight Shadow may also refer to:

- Moonlight Shadows, a 1986 album by The Shadows
- Moonlight Shadow: The Collection, a 2013 compilation album by Mike Oldfield
- "Moonlight Shadow: Tsuki ni Hoero", a 1996 single by Akina Nakamori
- "Moonlight Shadow" (novella), a 1986 novella by Banana Yoshimoto

== See also ==
- Shadows in the Moonlight
