= William Tell Overture (Mike Oldfield instrumental) =

Single by Mike Oldfield
- Released: 28 January 1977
- Genre: Folk, rock, classical music
- Length: 3:55
- Label: Virgin Records
- Songwriter: Gioachino Rossini
- Producer: Mike Oldfield

Mike Oldfield singles chronology
| "Portsmouth" (1976) | "William Tell Overture" (1977) | "Cuckoo Song" (1977) |

"William Tell Overture" is a single by musician Mike Oldfield, released on 28 January 1977. It is a rendition of the last movement (Allegro molto) from Gioachino Rossini's William Tell Overture, played in a deliberately much slower arrangement than Rossini's original piece. This version of the William Tell Overture did not have much of an impact on the UK charts. It is the first of the two non-album singles released by Mike Oldfield in 1977.

== B-sides ==
The UK B-side was "Argiers", which had previously been the European b-side for an earlier Oldfield single "Portsmouth". "Argiers" had been recorded in January 1976 at Througham and features Leslie Penning on recorders. Some European versions included the track "First Excursion" as the B-side, however in Brazil the B-side was "Portsmouth". The B-sides were taken from Oldfield's Collaborative/Remix box set, Boxed.

== Track listing ==
=== UK ===
VS 167

1. "William Tell Overture" (Gioachino Rossini) – 3:55
2. "Argiers" (Traditional) – 3:59

=== Europe ===
17 480 AT / VIN 45010

1. "William Tell Overture" (Gioachino Rossini) – 3:53
2. "First Excursion" (David Bedford, Mike Oldfield) – 5:57

=== Russia ===
6079 201

1. "William Tell Overture" (Gioachino Rossini)
2. "Portsmouth" (Traditional)

== Release and promotion ==
The single was released in February 1977, yet earlier Oldfield referred to the single in the Record Mirror noting that it was planned for release in January; "I've recently recorded a version of the "William Tell Overture". It's a real rouser and it should be out in January."

An advert produced for the single read: "The new single from the more whimsical side of Mike Oldfield. You clog-danced to "In Dulci Jubilo". You crashed through the ceiling to "Portsmouth". Now hear "William Tell Overture" by Mike Oldfield. It'll shake you to the core."

=== Promotional video clip ===
The music video for The William Tell Overture consists of eight incarnations of Oldfield performing the song on different instruments. A complex multi-split screen technique was used. The effect is as if a room full of Oldfields were playing together.
