= Cuckoo Song (instrumental) =

1977 single by Mike Oldfield

Single by Mike Oldfield with Les Penning
- A-side: "Cuckoo Song"
- B-side: "Pipe Tune"
- Released: 25 November 1977
- Recorded: 1977
- Genre: Folk
- Length: 6:40
- Label: Virgin Records
- Songwriter(s): Michael Praetorius
- Producer(s): Mike Oldfield

Mike Oldfield singles chronology
"William Tell Overture" (1977)	"Cuckoo Song" (1977)	"Take Four" (1978)

"Cuckoo Song" is a musical piece written by Michael Praetorius (1571 – 1621). In 1977, British musician Mike Oldfield released an arrangement of the piece as a single.

== Mike Oldfield single ==
Mike Oldfield released a version of "Cuckoo Song" in 1977 as a non-album single on Virgin Records. The B side, a musical precursor of the double LP Incantations and which could almost be a part of it, is an original composition by Oldfield. The single (in a plain white sleeve) was included as a free bonus when Incantations was released in 1978. It is one of the many non-album singles which Oldfield released in the 1970s. "Cuckoo Song" also features Les Penning.

=== Track listing ===
1. "Cuckoo Song" – 3:13
2. "Pipe Tune" – 3:27
