= Shadows in the Moonlight =

Shadows in the Moonlight may refer to:

- "Shadows in the Moonlight" (song), a 1979 song by Anne Murray
- "Shadows in the Moonlight" (short story), a short story starring Conan the Cimmerian, written by Robert E. Howard

== See also ==
- Moonlight Shadow (disambiguation)
