= Christina Booth =

British singer

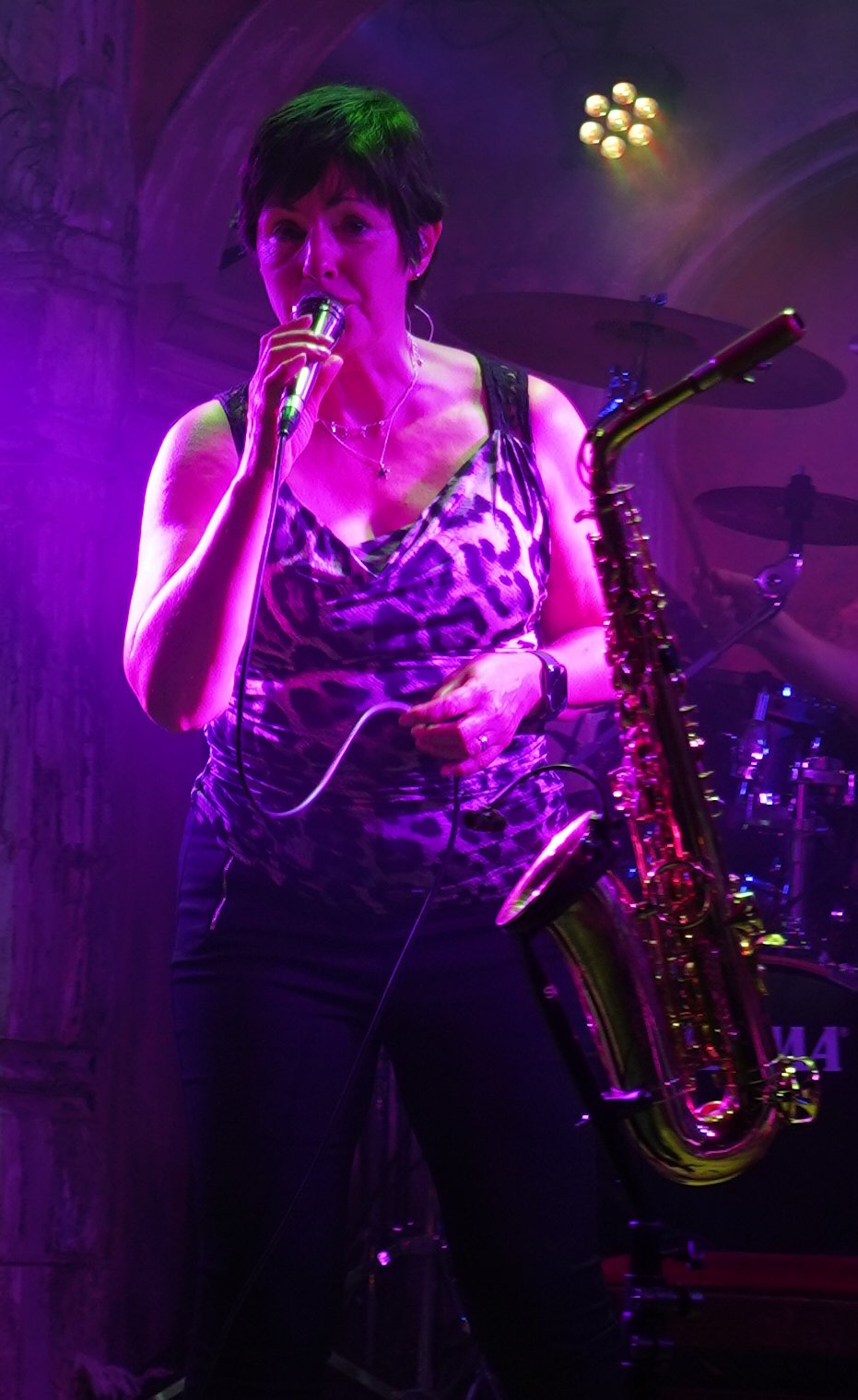
Booth in 2022

Christina Maria Booth (born 1965) is a Welsh progressive rock vocalist and singer-songwriter.

Since its inception in 2001, she has been the lead vocalist for the Welsh progressive rock band Magenta, in which she collaborates with Rob Reed.

Before that, she collaborated with Reed as part of Trippa and also his project Cyan. She has previously been credited under her maiden name as Christina Murphy, and now often is credited simply as Christina.

== Discography ==
=== Studio ===
- Broken Lives And Bleeding Hearts (2010)
- The Light (2015)
- Bar Stool Prophet (2023)
