= Sea Songs =

Ralph Vaughan Williams c. 1920

Sea Songs is an arrangement of three British sea-songs by the English composer Ralph Vaughan Williams. It is based on the songs "Princess Royal", "Admiral Benbow" and "Portsmouth". The work is a march of roughly four minutes duration. It follows a ternary structure, with opening material based on "Princess Royal" and "Admiral Benbow", with "Portsmouth" forming the central section before a return to the opening material featuring the first two songs.

The march was arranged for military band in 1923 as the second movement of English Folk Song Suite, and the world premiere of the suite was given at Kneller Hall on 4 July 1923. As a single work, its first performance was given at Wembley during the British Empire Exhibition in April 1924. This work, as well as the English Folk Song Suite, stemmed from Vaughan Williams' admiration for the band of the Royal Military School of Music at Kneller Hall. The work was re-arranged for full orchestra in 1942 by the composer.

The term "sea songs" may also be used to refer to any songs about or concerned with ships and seafarers. Such songs (including sea shanties and other work songs) are most commonly classed as folk music and are a major feature of maritime festivals held at seaports (and some river-ports) around the UK.

Incipit of "Princess Royal"

Incipit of "Admiral Benbow"
Incipit of "Portsmouth"

== Performances and recordings ==
The Vaughan Williams piece became well known in the United Kingdom as the theme tune to the BBC television adaptation of Billy Bunter in the 1950s, which used the central, "Portsmouth", section as its title music. It was also used as the start-up music to Anglia Television until the early 1980s. Both used the 1955 orchestral recording of the work performed by the New Concert Orchestra, conducted by Nat Nyll, which was part of the Boosey & Hawkes music library. This version is available on CD. Other more recent stereo recordings include performances conducted by Richard Hickox with the Northern Sinfonia, Leonard Slatkin with the Philharmonia Orchestra, George Hurst with the Bournemouth Sinfonietta and Paul Murphy with the Royal Ballet Sinfonia. The original military band score is available in a recording by the Royal Northern College of Music Wind Orchestra conducted by Timothy Reynish.

To commemorate the fiftieth anniversary of the death of Vaughan Williams, the piece was performed at the 2008 Last Night of the Proms, in place of the traditional Fantasia on British Sea Songs by Sir Henry Joseph Wood, founding conductor of the Proms, and friend of Vaughan Williams.
