= Return to Ommadawn =

Studio album by Mike Oldfield
- Released: 20 January 2017
- Recorded: December 2015–May 2016
- Studio: Oldfield's home studio in Nassau, Bahamas
- Genre: Progressive rock; world music; folk rock
- Length: 42:07
- Label: Virgin EMI
- Producer: Mike Oldfield

Mike Oldfield chronology
Man on the Rocks (2014)	Return to Ommadawn (2017)

Return to Ommadawn is the twenty-sixth and final studio album by English musician and songwriter Mike Oldfield. It was released on 20 January 2017 on Virgin EMI Records and is the sequel to his 1975 album Ommadawn. The CD/DVD-Audio set contains a 5.1 surround sound mix of the album. Return to Ommadawn is the last studio album Oldfield released before the announcement of his retirement in 2023.

== Background ==
In March 2014, Oldfield released his album Man on the Rocks, which marked a diversion from his traditional long-form, instrumental style of music as it comprised standard rock songs with vocals. When Oldfield started on his next album he took to social media, asking fans what sort of album they would like from him. He found that the majority of people who responded wished for a long-form, acoustic-oriented one similar to that of his first three: Tubular Bells (1973), Hergest Ridge (1974), and Ommadawn (1975), and learned that the latter had become a particular favourite among fans. This influenced Oldfield to record a sequel to Ommadawn which had been on his mind for some time; his 1990 album Amarok was originally going to be Ommadawn II before the material "went off in its own direction" and the idea was shelved. In addition, Oldfield wished to make the sequel after he logged into an online chat with French musician Jean-Michel Jarre, who said that he was a fan of Oldfield's music and wished to collaborate with him on his Electronica project, but considered his music "too acoustic". Oldfield recalled: "This got me thinking. If someone like him believes I'm an acoustic musician, then it showed how important that part of my career has been."

== Recording ==
On 16 October 2015, Oldfield posted on his Twitter account that he had started working on music for "a new Ommadawn" for the past week to see if the concept "actually works". Oldfield was aware of the popularity of Hergest Ridge and used the album for inspiration for Return to Ommadawn. This was the case for the introduction, whereby a folk melody was to start the piece before Oldfield changed it to a more atmospheric one. Ideas were explored further in subsequent weeks, and Oldfield began recording in December 2015 at his home studio in Nassau, Bahamas. Early on, Oldfield realised that he was out of practise in his guitar technique, as his fingertips had softened, causing pain when playing. He focused on the instrument for three weeks to get up to scratch.

Oldfield began by gathering the necessary instruments that he intended to play on the album and arrange his studio into an environment that he could work in. This involved the purchase of a mandolin, ukulele, and bodhrán. He then decided to record in time with a wind-up metronome, as opposed to a programmed click track, and set up his workspace and Pro Tools software to resemble a 24-track machine that he had used in the 1970s. Oldfield had used Logic Pro software but found it increasingly unreliable, which prompted him to switch to Pro Tools and invest in larger, 4K resolution screens, which allowed him to view a 20-minute piece on one display without scrolling. Oldfield played sections of the album to his two sons for feedback; one suggested that a part sounded too busy and should instead feature just one instrument, which Oldfield took onboard and has bits that feature one guitar. As with the original Ommadawn, Oldfield left mistakes in the recording to retain a human quality to the music as opposed to a highly produced sound.

In May 2016, Oldfield stated on Facebook that the album was finished and that an official release date had yet to be confirmed. Towards the end of recording in late 2016, the Bahamas suffered a direct hit from Hurricane Matthew, which caused extensive damage to Oldfield's home, resulting in loss of main power for three weeks. When the album was finished, Oldfield delivered the recordings to Virgin EMI using a backup Internet connection through a small satellite dish installed on his roof. The transfer took around 24 hours due to the low speeds. On 7 December 2016, Oldfield announced a release date of 20 January 2017. On the same day, a 3-minute excerpt aired on Steve Wright's afternoon show on BBC Radio 2.

Return to Ommadawn is Oldfield's first album since Incantations (1978) that follows the format of having one track per side of vinyl simply titled "Part One" and "Part Two".

== Reception ==
On Metacritic the album has a score of 64 out of 100 based on reviews from 7 critics, indicating "generally favorable reviews". It charted at number 1 in Spain.

== Track listing ==
All music by Mike Oldfield.

Side one
No.	Title	Length
1.	"Return to Ommadawn Pt. I"	21:10

Side two
No.	Title	Length
2.	"Return to Ommadawn Pt. II"	20:56

== Personnel ==
=== Music ===
All instruments played by Mike Oldfield.

Stringed instruments:

- Acoustic steel guitar
- Flamenco guitar
- Bass guitar
- Acoustic bass guitar
- Electric guitars
  - Gibson
  - Fender Telecaster
  - Fender Stratocaster
  - PRS Signature
- Mandolins
- Banjo
- Ukulele
- Celtic harp

Keyboards:

- Vox Continental organ
- Hammond organ
- Farfisa organ
- Mellotron
- Solina string machine
- Clavioline
- Piano

Percussion:

- Bodhran
- African table drums
- Glockenspiel
- Penny whistles in B♭, C, D, E♭, F, and G
- Vocal effects derived from the original Ommadawn

=== Production ===
- Mike Oldfield – production, engineering, inner cover photography, 5.1 surround sound mixing
- Paschal Byrne – mastering at Audio Archiving
- Miles Showell – half-speed vinyl mastering at Abbey Road Studios
- Daryl Easlea – project co-ordination
- Rupert Lloyd – illustration
- Phil Smee – artwork

== Charts ==
=== Weekly charts ===
Weekly chart performance for Return to Ommadawn
Chart (2017)	Peak position
Australian Albums (ARIA)	61
Austrian Albums (Ö3 Austria)	6
Belgian Albums (Ultratop Flanders)	31
Belgian Albums (Ultratop Wallonia)	21
Czech Albums (ČNS IFPI)	2
Dutch Albums (Album Top 100)	28
French Albums (SNEP)	44
German Albums (Offizielle Top 100)	3
Hungarian Albums (MAHASZ)	4
Irish Albums (IRMA)	43
Italian Albums (FIMI)	26
Polish Albums (ZPAV)	23
Portuguese Albums (AFP)	45
Spanish Albums (PROMUSICAE)	1
Swedish Albums (Sverigetopplistan)	38
Swiss Albums (Schweizer Hitparade)	8
UK Albums (OCC)	4

=== Year-end charts ===
Year-end chart performance for Return to Ommadawm
Chart (2017)	Position
Spanish Albums (PROMUSICAE)	63
