= This Winter Machine =

English progressive rock band

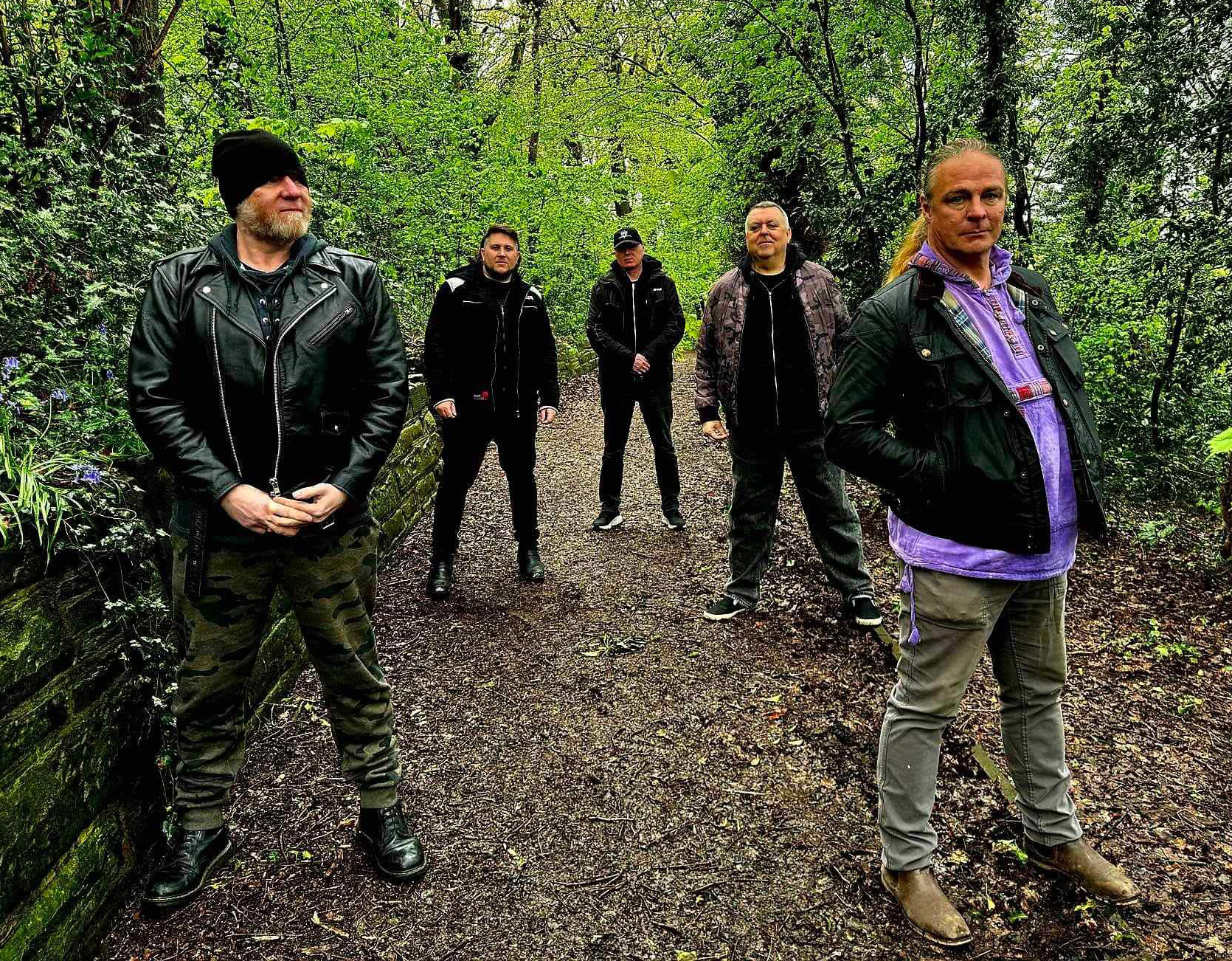
- This Winter Machine 2024; Left to right: Dave Close, Aaron Gidney, Alan Wilson, Al Winter, Leigh Perkins

Background information
- Origin: West Yorkshire, England
- Genres: Progressive rock
- Years active: 2016 - present
- Label: Progressive Gears 2016, F2 Music 2017-2019, Plane Groovy 2020-2022, White Knight Records 2023-Present
- Members: Al Winter (Vocals); Dave Close (Bass); Hugo Donno-Fuller (Drums); Leigh Perkins (Keys); Ralph Cardall (Guitars)
- Past members: John Cook, Simon D'Vali, Dom Bennison, Mark Numan, Peter Priestley, Stuart McAuley, Graham Garbett, Scott Owens, Gary Jevon, Andy Milner, Marcus Murray, Alan Wilson, Aaron Gidney
- Website: thiswintermachine.net

This Winter Machine are an English progressive rock band from West Yorkshire, England, formed and named by vocalist, musician and songwriter Al Winter in 2016. To date, the band has released four albums: The Man Who Never Was (2017), A Tower of Clocks (2019), Kites (2021) and The Clockwork Man (2023).

== History ==
=== Formation ===
The band were founded in early 2016, initially settling on the line-up of Al Winter (vocals), Mark Numan (keyboards), Peter Priestley (bass), Marcus Murray (drums) and Gary Jevon (guitar). The concept for a new progressive rock band was conceived by Winter; he had written the song that would go on to be the title track of the debut album, The Man Who Never Was, some 10 years prior to forming the band. The band quickly became known to the progressive rock community after supporting popular English rock band Magnum on their UK tour in July 2016. Prog Magazine issue 72's cover CD featured the song "After Tomorrow Comes" that would later appear on the first album.

=== The Man Who Never Was ===
This Winter Machine's debut album was recorded during 2016 at Moorcroft Studios and Czar Street Studios in Cleckheaton and Leeds respectively. The production was handled by Winter. This Winter Machine signed with the record label Progressive Gears ahead of the release of album. The Man Who Never Was was officially released 16 January 2017 and was met with largely positive reviews internationally, with reviewers hailing "the next great British Prog band". The album also received a full-page feature on the inside cover of the Classic Rock Society magazine for that month (This Winter Machine were subsequently nominated for the "Best Newcomer 2016" award at CRS' awards ceremony in March 2017).

The band held an album launch party on 4 February 2017 where The Man Who Never Was was played live and in full. The set also featured a new song called "Herald", the band having started work on a follow-up album. Shortly after the album launch, the band parted ways with both Gary Jevon and Progressive Gears. Graham Garbett and Scott Owens were recruited to handle guitar duties. The decision to bring in more than one guitarist resulted in a broadened soundscape at the live shows, adding complex textures of guitar work in both the acoustic and electric arena. The Man Who Never Was was later re-released via F2 Records.

In the latter months of 2017, This Winter Machine performed several times, including a support slot for German prog band Crystal Palace on 1 October 2017. Three new songs written for A Tower Of Clocks featured during this run of shows (these songs were "Herald", "Symmetry and Light" and "Justified").

Drummer Marcus Murray left the band after their gig at the Summers End Festival in October 2017, with Andy Milner replacing him. Milner's first performance with the band would see them supporting Magnum once again at Warehouse23 in Wakefield on 16 November 2017.

The band recorded a full live performance at Eiger Studios, Leeds on 20 January 2018 with the intention of releasing footage as bonus material alongside the upcoming album or as a live DVD. Two new songs made their live debuts at this performance; "Flying" and "Carnivale". This Winter Machine played alongside Mostly Autumn at the Classic Rock Society awards ceremony on 3 March 2018 and received the award for "Best Newcomer 2017".

=== A Tower Of Clocks ===
Work on the second album had already begun by the time The Man Who Never Was was officially released. Described as covering themes such as time, loss and identity within a loose conceptual framework, the band were originally hoping for a release date in 2018. Pre-orders began in September of that year offering Gold, Silver and Bronze Packages. The Gold and Silver tiers were to include a bonus CD including 3 live tracks from The Man Who Never Was, taken from the recording of the 2018 Eiger Studios show in Leeds.

Through no fault of the band, issues with the studio delayed the release and led to the eventual release date being on 20 May 2019 but the fans agreed the wait was well worth it. It was evident the band had really pushed forward in terms of musicianship, lyrical themes and production. With stunning cover by artist Tom Roberts and interior art complementing the album, reviews were extremely favourable.

A Tower of Clocks was also the first album from this Winter Machine to get a vinyl pressing. Following the success of the CD package, there was plenty of interest from the fans in a vinyl version. This was released in June as a double disc package again including the 3 live bonus tracks on side 4. Although still released under the F2 label, production of the vinyl pressing came from Plane Groovy who would eventually become the band's main label later that year.

=== A Tour of Clocks ===
This Winter Machine embarked on their 'Tour of Clocks' across the UK on 29 July 2018, kicking off with a two-act set at the Cutler’s Arms in Rotherham, playing both albums in full. A bold move perhaps to play the yet unreleased second album to live audiences, however it was a move that paid off with an overwhelmingly positive response to the new material. The tour continued into the latter half of the year and through 2019. April 2019 saw the departure of original bass player Peter Priestly and the introduction of Stuart McAuley who would play his first show with the band on 6 September, the first of a three-day consecutive run with German proggers KariBoW.

2019 culminated in a celebratory show at Wolverhampton's Slade Rooms at which the band also signed to their new record label, moving from F2 Music to Plane Groovy, the label previously responsible for making A Tower of Clocks available on vinyl. The band finally made it down to the capital to headline a 4-band event at Nambucca, London N7 on 29 February 2020. Alas, this was to be their final show of 2020 as their next scheduled appearance at Stourport SubFusion Festival was sadly pulled with just days to go due to the Coronavirus pandemic.

==== A Tour of Clocks 2018-19 ====
29 July 2018 – The Cutler’s Arms, Rotherham. (An evening with TWM, two-act set)

12 August 2018 - The Robin 2, Bilston. (Plus Hey Jester)

26 August 2018 - Talking Heads, Southampton. (Plus Servants of Science)

29 September 2018 - The Citadel, St. Helens. (Plus IO Earth)

17 November 2018 - HRH Prog Pwllheli, North Wales. (3-day festival, multiple bands)

23 Feb 2019 - O’ Reillys, Hull. (Plus Sir Curse)

24 March 2019 - Stourport Fusion Festival. (3-day festival, multiple bands)

8 April 2019 - The Robin 2, Bilston. (Plus Crystal Palace)

6 September 2019 - Craufurd Arms, Milton Keynes. (Plus KariBoW)

7 September 2019 - The Musician, Leicester. (Plus KariBoW)

8 September 2019 - O’ Reillys, Hull. (Plus KariBoW)

29 September 2019 - The Robin, Bilston. (Plus Circu5, Jump & The Reasoning)

19 Oct 2019 – Corporation, Sheffield. (Plus Under a Banner)

7 December 2019 - The Slade Rooms, Wolverhampton. (Plus Under a Banner)

29 February 2020 – Nambucca, London. (Plus I am the Manic Whale, The Gift & The Dame)

=== Kites ===
As early as 2018, the seeds of the idea for album number three were sown. Even before A Tower of Clocks had gone into production, the title ‘Kites’ had been decided upon (If you look closely at the cover artwork for A Tower of Clocks you can see a kite being flown behind the tower!). Writing began during rehearsal sessions in 2018, the artwork concept was decided upon in 2019 and by the beginning of 2020 several tracks were nearing completion.

In July 2020 guitarist Scott Owens decided to leave the band and by early 2021, due to frustrations in getting all the other existing members together in the studio at one time in order to complete writing and start recording Kites, Winter decided an additional change of personnel was needed, recruiting Simon D’Vali (guitars) and Alan Wilson (drums), having previously worked with them on his solo project ‘Wynter’ and Dom Bennison (guitars) and Dave Close (bass) to continue forward as This Winter Machine.

Numan, Garbett, Milner and McAuley left to form their own project ‘Ghost of the Machine’ joining forces again with previous TWM guitarist Scott Owens and Harmony of Spheres vocalist Charlie Bramald. It was agreed that any songs previously worked on for Kites would be fairly distributed and kept by those who had written them.

The line-up change gave a new momentum to the band and completion of the writing stage of Kites accelerated at a rapid pace, a difficult thing to achieve during a global pandemic but thankfully government guidelines at the time allowed the band to meet to rehearse and then record whilst still maintaining the social distancing rules.

Although the new line-up is temporarily without a full-time keyboard player, they managed to secure the services of Pat Sanders (Drifting Sun) as a guest keys player on all tracks of the album. Other special guests making an appearance include Peter Jones (Tiger Moth Tales, Red Bazar, Camel) and Mark Abrahams (Wishbone Ash)

The new incarnation of This Winter Machine made their first ‘public’ appearance on April 24, 2021, during the YouTube online Fusion Festival ‘Light at the end of the Tunnel’, debuting three tracks from Kites: "The Storm", "Limited" and "Pleasure and Purpose".

Kites was eventually released on 28 October 2021 both on CD and digital formats. A vinyl pressing is in the pipeline and expected for release in Spring 2022.

The immediate response from the fans and critics alike was extremely favourable in both the UK and Europe and within just four weeks since release, Kites sold more copies than both The Man Who Never Was, and A Tower of Clocks combined.

=== Kites Live performances ===
With COVID restrictions beginning to ease later on in 2021, the new line up of the band had their first opportunity to play in front of a live audience, so a launch event for Kites was arranged for 7 November 2021, returning once more to the site of the debut album launch, Eiger Studios in Leeds. It was also publicised that this event would be filmed for a live DVD due for release early in the new year.

The band were welcomed with a capacity turnout and fantastic response to the new material which had only been released just over a week previously. Kites was played in its entirety with encore tracks from the first two albums, After Tomorrow Comes from The Man Who Never Was and Herald from A Tower of Clocks. The evening was rounded up with a cover version of The Police's Synchronicity.

The DVD footage of the launch was edited by the bands own Dom Bennison and was released as ‘Kites Live in Leeds’ on 14 January 2022, including all the tracks from Kites with a running time of 46 minutes. The audio from the live show was also made available as a digital download from Bandcamp in the following few days.

In the weeks following the album launch, the band played their second performance of Kites at The Queen Victoria Hall in Oundle on 27 November. The support on the night was Red Bazar featuring the multi-talented Peter Jones who also kindly joined the headliners to make his second appearance of the evening and took to the mic to sing ‘Sometimes’, the track from Kites on which he made a guest appearance on vocals.

=== Kites Tour Dates ===
7 November 2021: Eiger Studios - Leeds (album launch with support from Ken Senior)

27 November 2021: Queen Victoria Hall - Oundle (Plus Red Bazar)

5 March 2022: Fusion 3.5 Festival - Stourport Civic Centre

3 April 2022: HRH Prog Festival - Sheffield

21 May 2022: O’Reillys - Hull (Plus Paul Menel and the Essentials)

22 October 2022: Highway to Hull - O’Reillys Hull (Plus Grace and Fire, Stuckfish, The Room and The Tirith)

11 February 2023: Chantry Brewery - Rotherham (with Hats Off Gentlemen, It’s Adequate and Firegarden)

=== The Clockwork Man ===
Writing started on album #4 soon after the release of Kites and an early teaser revealed that the upcoming album would be a concept album entitled ‘The Clockwork Man’. A demo version of the first track ‘The River’ was released as early as February 2022 and the striking cover art was revealed to the fans a couple of months later in April as the band started the initial stages of recording.

They were back in familiar territory for much of the recording process, choosing Eiger Studios in Leeds again for all the instrumental recording and most of the vocals as well as Vibrations Studios in Huddersfield for a few extra vocal pieces later in the process.

The recording timeline wasn't without its moments of significant change. Mid 2022 saw Guitarist Dom Bennison leaving in June to concentrate more on his love of music production and mixing. Also, the lengthy search for a permanent keyboard player finally came to fruition with the position being filled by the multi-talented Leigh Perkins, the announcements of both Dom's departure and Leigh's appointment coming on the same day.

Bennison's position was filled in August of the same year with John Cook joining as a guest guitarist. Cook had previously worked with Al Winter before the band's debut album was even recorded, helping co-write parts of an original version of the sixteen-minute epic The Man Who Never Was. He became a permanent member of the band in March 2023.

In another guitarist shake-up, albeit an amicable one, Simon D’Vali chose to step back in December 2022 a few months into the process to spend more time with his family.

Perkins and Cook made an immediate impression, playing with remarkable dexterity from the get-go. Whereas TWM traditionally had a twin guitar approach, it became clear that Cook's skills could cover both roles with relative ease, so the band settled nicely into a 5-piece lineup. He went on to have a considerable input on the album, writing the track ‘The Final Goodbye’ and co-writing another four tracks on the album with Al Winter and Leigh Perkins.

Following the initial ‘Highway to Hull’ gig in October 2022, the band built many strong relationships with their fellow musicians on the bill. Grace and Fire, a young band from Nottingham made quite an impact with their melodic prog metal style set and the north east's ‘Stuckfish’ are a formidable live band to impress any audience. Members from both these bands would go on to play a major part in the final version of The Clockwork Man.

Following the success of Peter Jones’ guest vocalist slot on Kites, this time, André Saint, lead vocalist of Grace and Fire was this time invited to sing on the track ‘Change’ and Ade Fisher, guitarist from Stuckfish, not only played the guest solo on 'The River Part II', but he produced and mixed the whole album.

The recording process spanned between April 2022 and July 2023 with the eventual release date being 27 September 2023. During that period, the band also switched record labels, striking up a deal with Robert Reed's White Knight Records.

As with previous albums, The Clockwork Man outsold its predecessor and was met with worldwide critical acclaim from fans and reviewers alike.

The concept behind the album is one of a sci-fi dystopian future and alongside the initial CD release was a special limited edition run of a short graphic novel outlining the story written by Al Winter and beautifully illustrated by Andrew Richmond.

Synopsis Of The Clockwork Man

In the not too-distant future, mankind has perfected human cloning. From birth to adult takes an accelerated 7 years incubation, then another 2 years raised and socialised in huge cities that are covered by artificial domes. A pre-rendered image of the sun is projected on the ceiling during the day, replaced by the moon at night.

Eventually they are ready to leave into the outside world.

They are bred male and sterile and have no rights to marry or study, travel or vote. They are born to simply take the jobs that nobody wants or are considered dangerous and cannot yet be automated.

They are given pills to take daily to keep them healthy and help them fight infection, but that in reality, keep them docile, skinny and unambitious.

Society has labelled them The Clockwork Men…

More personnel changes were to come in January 2024 with John Cook leaving to concentrate on his own project ‘Age of Distraction'. Following Cook's departure, the band had a couple of live appearances to fulfil, so an advertisement to find a replacement was immediately issued. As a temporary measure, rehearsals began with Aaron Gidney from This Winter Machine's good friends Grace and Fire stepping in to fill the role. Two successful Scottish shows followed in Kinross and Glasgow respectively and in May 2024, it was announced that Gidney would join the band as a permanent member whilst also remaining as guitarist for Grace and Fire.

In late 2024, Gidney and long-time drummer Alan Wilson stepped away from the band. As of 2025, the drum stool was filled by Hugo Donno-Fuller, and Drifting Sun guitarist Ralph Cardall became the band's new guitarist. The first show with this line-up took place on 25 January 2025 in Leeds at Seven Arts, alongside Cornish prog outfit The Emerald Dawn.

=== The Clockwork Man Tour Dates ===
1 April 2023: Official Album Launch, Eiger Studios – Leeds (plus Grace and Fire)

30 September 2023: Highway 2 Hull - O’Reillys Hull (Plus Spriggan Mist, Grace and Fire, Tiger Moth Tales)

15 October 2023: Prog Rhino – Greystones, Sheffield (Plus Stuckfish, Haze and The Tirith)

10 Mar 2024: Backstage at the Green – Kinross

16 March 2024: Ivory Blacks – Glasgow (plus Stuckfish)

4 August 2024: The 1865 – Southampton (plus Stuckfish)

21 September 2024: Highway ’24, Eiger Studios – Leeds (plus Paul Brunton, Candacraig, Stuckfish and Magenta)

== Albums ==
=== The Man Who Never Was (2017) ===
No.	Title	Length
1.	"The Man Who Never Was"	16:05
2.	"The Wheel"	9:28
3.	"Lullaby (Interrupted)"	4:53
4.	"After Tomorrow Comes"	7:58
5.	"Fractured"	10:26

=== A Tower of Clocks (2019) ===
No.	Title	Length
1.	"Herald"	8:48
2.	"Flying"	3:31
3.	"Spiral"	2:17
4.	"Symmetry and Light"	7:29
5.	"Justified"	4:39
6.	"In Amber"	3:57
7.	"The Hunt"	7:22
8.	"Delta"	8:26
9.	"When We Were Young"	5:16
10.	"Carnivale"	9:10

=== Kites (2021) ===
No.	Title	Length
1.	"Le Jour D'avant"	01:40
2.	"The Storm (Part 1)"	05:37
3.	"The Storm (Part 2)"	04:36
4.	"Limited"	02:00
5.	"Pleasure & Purpose"	06:35
6.	"This Heart's Alive"	06:31
7.	"Whirlpool"	02:16
8.	"Broken"	04:58
9.	"Sometimes"	04:05
10.	"Kites"	07:18

=== The Clockwork Man (2023) ===
No.	Title	Length
1.	"The River (Parts I & II)"	11.17
2.	"Solitude, Silence and Steam"	08.18
3.	"Final Goodbye"	02.55
4.	"Change (feat. André Saint)"	05.42
5.	"Reflections"	05.06
6.	"Nothing Lasts Forever"	06.08
7.	"The Light"	04.50
8.	"Falling Through a Hole in the Sky"	07.31

== Accolades ==
- Best Newcomer 2017 (winner) - Classic Rock Society
- Best Newcomer 2017 (top 5) - Prog Magazine
- Best Newcomer 2016 (nominated) - Classic Rock Society
