= English Folk Song Suite =

Composition by Ralph Vaughan Williams

Ralph Vaughan Williams c. 1920

English Folk Song Suite is one of English composer Ralph Vaughan Williams' most famous works. It was first published for the military band as Folk Song Suite and its premiere was given at Kneller Hall on 4 July 1923, conducted by Lt Hector Adkins. The piece was then arranged for full orchestra in 1924 by Vaughan Williams' student Gordon Jacob and published as English Folk Song Suite. The piece was later arranged for British-style brass band in 1956 by Frank Wright and published as English Folk Songs Suite. All three versions were published by Boosey & Hawkes. Note the use of three different titles for the three different versions. The suite uses the melodies of nine English folk songs, six of which were drawn from the collection made by Vaughan Williams' friend and colleague Cecil Sharp.

== Structure ==
The suite consists of three movements: March, Intermezzo and another March. The first march is called "Seventeen Come Sunday", the Intermezzo is subtitled "My Bonny Boy" and the final movement is based on four "Folk Songs from Somerset".

It originally had a fourth movement, "Sea Songs", which was played second, but the composer removed it after the first performance and published it separately, with his own orchestration.

=== March: "Seventeen Come Sunday" ===
Seventeen Come Sunday opens after a four-bar introduction with the principal melody – the folk song "Seventeen Come Sunday" (Roud 277) – played by the woodwind section (flutes in orchestrated version). This melody is repeated, and the woodwind is joined by the brass (violins in orchestrated version). The phrasing is irregular – the melody lasts for thirteen bars. Vaughan Williams appears to have used two alternative versions of this song from Cecil Sharp's collection, one from the Traveller Kathleen Williams in the Forest of Dean, and the other from his prolific source Lucy White of Hambridge, Somerset.

This melody is followed by "Pretty Caroline" (Roud 1448) as a quiet air for solo clarinet or solo cornet (clarinet only in orchestrated version), which is also repeated. This tune was derived from a recording made in 1908 by Ella Mary Leather from Ellen Powell of Westhope, Herefordshire, using a phonograph loaned to her by Vaughan Williams. He later transcribed the song from the recording, which is publicly available online.

A third melody, "Dives and Lazarus" (Roud 177, Child 56) then enters in the lower instruments. This tune comes from the collection of Vaughan Williams himself: he notated the song "The Red Barn", set to a variant of the well-known "Dives and Lazarus" melody, from a Mr John Whitby in Norfolk in 1905. The arrangement here is particularly interesting for having a 6/8 rhythm played as a counterpoint by the upper woodwinds, against the straight 2/4 rhythm of the saxophones and brasses. This third theme is repeated, then leads straight back to the second theme. Finally, the first theme is repeated in a da capo al coda. The form of this movement can be represented by A–B–C–B–A (arch form).

"Seventeen Come Sunday"

Pretty Caroline

=== Intermezzo: "My Bonny Boy" ===
"My Bonny Boy" (Roud 293) opens with a solo in F Dorian for the oboe (sometimes doubled or played by solo cornet) on the tune of the folk song of the same name, which is repeated by the low-register instruments. Midway through the movement, a Poco Allegro begins on "Green Bushes" (Roud 1040), first sounded by a piccolo, E♭ clarinet, and oboe in a minor harmonic context, then repeated by the lower brass with major harmony. The first melody is played again in fragmented form before the close of the movement.

Vaughan Williams noted on his score that "My Bonny Boy" was taken from the book English County Songs while the "Green Bushes" melody seems to have been adapted from two versions collected by Cecil Sharp, one in the Dorian and one in the Mixolydian mode, the modal ambiguity being reflected in the composer's harmonization.

=== March: "Folk Songs from Somerset" ===
"Folk Songs from Somerset" is based on the melodies of four folk songs from the eponymous collection published in five volumes by Cecil Sharp with Charles Marson, based on fieldwork they had carried out in the county during the early 1900s. It opens with a light introduction of four measures before a jaunty major melody, "Blow Away the Morning Dew" (Roud 11, Child 112) collected from Lucy White and Lucy Hooper in Hambridge in 1903, is introduced on solo cornet (clarinet in orchestration). This melody is then dovetailed around the band/orchestra before finishing with a fortissimo reprise. A second melody in the Aeolian mode, "High Germany" (Roud 904), from Mrs. Lock of Muchelney Ham then takes over. This is played in the tenor and lower register with trombones prominent, while the remaining instruments provide an on-beat chordal accompaniment.

As this second melody dies away, the original melody is heard once again with a tutti reprise. This leads into the trio, with a key change and a time change to 6/8, introducing a more delicate modal air played by the woodwind with a light accompaniment. In the past this melody has been identified erroneously as "The Trees They Do Grow High" (Roud 31), but more recent research has found a much closer correspondence with the song "Whistle, Daughter, Whistle" (Roud 1570), as sung by Walter Locock of Martock. This melody continues until the time signature changes back to the original 2/4, with the entry of a robust major melody, John Barleycorn (Roud 164), originally taken down by Sharp from Robert Pope of Minehead. This enters in the lower instruments (trombones and double basses in orchestrated version) while the cornets play decorative features above. The trio is then repeated in full before a da capo is reached and the first two themes are revisited. The form of this movement can be represented by A–B–A. (ternary form)

"Blow Away the Morning Dew"

"High Germany"

== Instrumentation ==
=== Original 1923 concert band version ===
- E♭ flute and piccolo, concert flute and piccolo, E♭ clarinet, solo B♭ clarinet, ripieno 1st B♭ clarinet, 2nd B♭ clarinet, 3rd B♭ clarinet, E♭ alto clarinet, B♭ bass clarinet, oboes and C clarinets, 1st bassoon, 2nd bassoon, E♭ alto saxophone, B♭ tenor saxophone, E♭ baritone saxophone, B♭ bass saxophone and contrabass clarinet, 1st B♭ cornets, 2nd B♭ cornets, B♭ trumpets, 1st and 2nd horns in F (E♭ in the score), 3rd and 4th horns in F (E♭ in the score), 1st trombone, 2nd trombone, bass trombone, B♭ baritone, euphonium, basses, timpani, drums (cymbals, bass drum, snare drum, triangle).

The suite was published in 1923 by Boosey & Hawkes as Folk Song Suite.

The part titled "concert flute and piccolo", although singular, requires at least two players since the flute and piccolo parts are simultaneous for much of the suite, and the final movement includes split parts. Other parts that require two players are the oboes and B♭ trumpets. The E♭ clarinet part has divisis in the final movement only, most of which is already doubled in the solo/first B♭ clarinet voice, making the second E♭ clarinet not entirely necessary. The contrabass clarinet and bass saxophone part is also divided, although one or both may be left out as the part is identical to the (also divided) "basses" (tuba and string bass) part. Solo and 1st B♭ cornets are printed on one part (originally titled "1st cornet"), but one player is required for solo and one for 1st. The part for B♭ baritone is actually for a baritone saxhorn, no longer present in the military band (not the euphonium) and this part disappears from later editions of the set, with the only evidence being cued notes on the euphonium part.

=== 2008 revised concert band version ===
- Concert flute and piccolo, oboe, E♭ clarinet, solo B♭ clarinet, 1st B♭ clarinet, 2nd B♭ clarinet, 3rd B♭ clarinet, E♭ alto clarinet, B♭ bass clarinet, 1st bassoon, 2nd bassoon, E♭ alto saxophone, B♭ tenor saxophone, E♭ baritone saxophone, B♭ bass saxophone and contrabass clarinet, solo and 1st B♭ cornets, 2nd B♭ cornet, B♭ trumpets, 1st and 2nd horns in F, 3rd and 4th horns in F, 1st trombone, 2nd trombone, bass trombone, euphonium, tuba, string bass, 1st and 2nd percussion (timpani, cymbals, bass drum, snare drum, triangle).

Boosey & Hawkes published a revised edition of the piece in 2008. This edition features a computer-engraved full score and parts, incorporating corrections to engraving errors evident in the original edition. Other changes include the addition of rehearsal numbers to the score and parts, the titles of the folk songs added where they occur in the music, the horns notated in F in the score instead of in E♭, the separation of the string bass from the tuba into its own part, and the percussion split into two parts.

English Folk Song Suite
Performed by the Ulm Philharmonic, conducted by James Allen Gähres

=== 1924 orchestra version ===
- 2 flutes (2nd doubling piccolo), oboe, 2 B♭ clarinets, bassoon, 2 horns in F, 2 B♭ trumpets, 2 trombones, timpani, percussion (cymbals, bass drum, side drum, triangle), strings (violins, violas, cellos, and double basses).

The suite was arranged for full orchestra by Gordon Jacob, one of Vaughan Williams' pupils, and published in 1924 by Boosey & Hawkes as English Folk Song Suite.

=== 1956 brass band version ===
- E♭ soprano cornet, solo B♭ cornet, ripieno B♭ cornet and flugelhorn (one part, two players), 2nd B♭ cornet, 3rd B♭ cornet, solo E♭ horn, 1st E♭ horn, 2nd E♭ horn, 1st B♭ baritone, 2nd B♭ baritone, 1st B♭ trombone, 2nd B♭ trombone, bass trombone, B♭ euphonium, E♭ bass, B♭ bass, drums (side drum, bass drum, cymbals and triangle), Timpani.

The suite was arranged for Brass Band by Frank Wright and published by Boosey & Hawkes in 1956 as English Folk Songs Suite (this follows the orchestral version in adding 'English' to the title but it also pluralises 'Songs'). The music is transposed down (by a perfect fourth) presumably to make it fit more comfortably within the register of the brass band. The arrangement uses the standard British brass band scoring for 25 brass players and two or three percussionists (see British brass band for details of transpositions and numbers of players per part). Rehearsal numbers were added to the score and parts but the individual folk tunes remain unnamed. This edition remains a staple of the Brass Band repertoire.
