= Shaun Sutton =

English television writer, director, producer and executive

Shaun Sutton OBE
- Born: Shaun Alfred Graham Sutton; 14 October 1919; Hammersmith, London, England
- Died: 14 May 2004 (aged 84); Norfolk, England
- Occupations: Writer; director; producer; executive
- Spouse: Barbara Leslie (m. 1948)
- Children: 4

Shaun Alfred Graham Sutton (14 October 1919 in Hammersmith, London – 14 May 2004 in Norfolk) was an English television writer, director, producer and executive, who worked in the medium for nearly forty years from the 1950s to the 1990s. His most important role was as the Head of Drama at BBC Television from the 1960s until 1981, a role he occupied for longer than anyone else.

== Early life ==
Sutton's father, Graham Sutton, was a theatre critic and novelist as well as being a teacher at Latymer Upper School, where Sutton himself was educated. His mother was an actress, and Sutton followed in her footsteps by enrolling in drama school after leaving Latymer. However, the coming of the Second World War interrupted his career and he joined the Royal Navy, seeing action in the Mediterranean and attaining the rank of lieutenant.

Following the end of the war, Sutton returned to the theatre, but increasingly moved toward writing and producing rather than acting, apparently on the advice of his mother. Later in life, he would claim that this advice had saved him from becoming "an ageing, mediocre actor". In the late 1940s he met the actress Barbara Leslie, to whom he was married until his death. He had four children – one boy and three girls.

== Television career ==
Sutton moved into television, the medium with which he was to become most closely associated, in 1952, joining the staff of the BBC's drama department. He found particular success in children's serials, writing and directing the likes of Queen's Champion (1958) and Bonehead (1960). In 1963, the new Head of Drama at the BBC, Sydney Newman, offered Sutton the job of being the first producer for the new science-fiction series Doctor Who, but Sutton declined.

One of his reasons for declining the role was that by this stage Sutton was beginning to make a name for himself in more adult drama series, directing several early episodes of the police drama Z-Cars from 1962. He worked as a director on other drama series such as The Last Man Out, The Troubleshooters and the Z-Cars spin-off Softly, Softly until 1966, when he moved into the upper echelons of the drama department by succeeding Gerald Savory as Head of Serials.

In this position, Sutton commissioned and oversaw some of the most prestigious of all BBC drama productions of the era, including in 1967 the epic twenty-six episode adaptation of John Galsworthy's The Forsyte Saga, among the most successful BBC drama productions of all time. After Sydney Newman left the BBC at the end of 1967, Sutton was appointed to succeed him as overall Head of Drama, initially on an acting basis combined with his Head of Serials role, and then from 1969 on a permanent basis.

He was to occupy the position for the next twelve years, until 1981, overseeing the entirety of the BBC's 1970s drama output. This era is commonly held to be one of the most successful in all BBC drama, described by The Guardian in their obituary of Sutton as being when "the golden age of television drama reached its zenith". Or in the words of the Royal Television Society in their obituary, "Unmatched by any other television organisation, BBC Television drama, under Shaun, offered in its schedules every shape, style and form of drama. It was a theatrical spectrum of extraordinary width and choice".

Sutton's reign saw success in many different styles and genres – there were continuing long-running successful and popular series such as Z-Cars and Doctor Who; the eclectic mix of styles and stories in the much-praised anthology strand Play for Today; and prestige serials such as The Six Wives of Henry VIII (1970), I, Claudius (1976) and Dennis Potter's Pennies From Heaven (1978). There were also low points, such as the embarrassing failure of Churchill's People (1974), a twenty-six part series based on Winston Churchill's A History of the English Speaking Peoples. Sutton deemed the production to be unbroadcastable upon seeing the result, but so much time, money and effort had been spent on making and publicising the series that he was left with little choice in the matter. There were also controversies surrounding the 'banning' by his superiors, against Sutton's wishes, of two entries into the Play for Today strand, Dennis Potter's Brimstone and Treacle in 1976 and Roy Minton's Scum in 1978.

Nonetheless, Sutton himself was seen as having been a great success in his role, and when he finally departed in 1981 he was not short of further work in the department. He returned to front-line producing duties, taking over the BBC's The Complete Dramatic Works of William Shakespeare series, which had been initiated by producer Cedric Messina under Sutton's aegis in the late 1970s. Sutton produced all of the remaining works between 1982 and 1986, some thirteen plays in all, including some of the less frequently performed plays.

He continued to work as a producer following the end of this run and into the late 1980s, mostly of theatrical adaptations for BBC2. His final work was as the producer of an adaptation of Mary Stewart's novel The Crystal Cave in 1991, after which he retired to the country cottage in Norfolk which he and his wife had bought in 1970.

== Honours and private life ==
Sutton was made an Officer of the Order of the British Empire (OBE), for his services to broadcasting, in 1979. In 1982, he published a book, The Largest Theatre in the World, about his experiences of working in the drama department of the BBC.

Married to Barbara Leslie from 1948 until his death, they had four children, all of whom survived him. He died following a short illness in May 2004.

Preceded by Sydney Newman	BBC Television Head of Drama; 1967–1981	Succeeded by Graeme MacDonald
