= Man on the Rocks =

Studio album by Mike Oldfield
- Released: 3 March 2014
- Recorded: 2013
- Studio: Mike Oldfield's home studio (Nassau, Bahamas); The Village (Los Angeles); Battery Studios (London)
- Genre: Rock, pop rock
- Length: 59:32
- Label: Virgin EMI
- Producer: Mike Oldfield, Stephen Lipson

Mike Oldfield chronology
| Music of the Spheres (2008) | Man on the Rocks (2014) | Return to Ommadawn (2017) |

Man on the Rocks is the twenty-fifth studio album by British musician Mike Oldfield, released on 3 March 2014 on the Virgin EMI label. The album is Oldfield's second full album of exclusively songs with no long or instrumental pieces, the first being 1989's Earth Moving.

== Recording and production ==
Man on the Rocks was produced by Stephen Lipson together with Oldfield. The album features bassist Leland Sklar, drummer John Robinson, keyboardist Matt Rollings, guitarist Michael Thompson and singer Luke Spiller together with Oldfield himself on guitar. The backing tracks were recorded during June 2013 in Studio D of Village Studios, Los Angeles with producer Steve Lipson; Oldfield participated in these sessions via Skype. Oldfield has also recorded part of the album in his home studio in the Bahamas. Oldfield's electric guitar sound on the album is primarily a Fender Telecaster combined with the Avid Eleven software plug-in.

The album marks a return of Oldfield to a Virgin branded label since leaving Virgin Records in the 1990s, through the merger of Mercury Records UK and Virgin Records after Universal Music's purchase of EMI. Luke Spiller is the singer of The Struts, another of Virgin EMI's British artists.

=== Lyrical content ===
The album deals with topics ranging from Oldfield's experiences with mental health to his Christian faith to a track inspired by the 2012 Summer Olympics. The piece "Irene" is inspired by Hurricane Irene which hit the Bahamas in 2011. The final track is a cover of William McDowell's gospel piece "I Give Myself Away". The working title for the album had been Rock.

Oldfield has used the title "Moonshine" once before for the final piece on 1992's Tubular Bells II. The song itself is a reworking of his 1994 instrumental "The Song Of The Boat Men", which was featured as a B-side of the "Hibernaculum" single.

The song "Nuclear" deals with his grandfather's experiences during World War I. When interviewed by the Daily Telegraph, he tells the background to writing the song. “I never knew him,” he says, “So I hired a company to find out about him. It turned out he was a great character before the war but came home a very different man. My mum was one of ten or eleven kids and all the children born after the war had problems like hers. I wanted to see if I could spread my senses in the place he was. I travelled around Ypres and the battlefield museums and I saw the graves of his regiment: the Royal Munster Fusiliers. And I could feel it. Still there. It’s a blessing and a curse for those of us who have this extra sensitivity.”

== Release ==
Man on the Rocks was released on 3 March 2014, after initially being planned for 27 January. The album is available on single CD, double CD, double vinyl, coloured double vinyl, digital download and a box set.

The two CD Deluxe Edition contains the album and a second instrumental disc. In the UK the boxed set is available exclusively through mikeoldfieldofficial.com - this includes the content from the Deluxe Edition as well as Oldfield's demos of the songs and 4 alternative mixes of songs. The boxed set also includes a 16-page CD size booklet, four art cards and a certificate of authenticity.

=== Singles and promotion ===
The first public airing of the album was an excerpt of "Sailing" that was played on Stuart Maconie's radio show on BBC Radio 6 Music in November 2013. The first full play of "Sailing" was on BBC Radio 2 on 14 January 2014.

"Sailing" was a record of the week on BBC Radio 2 during the first week of February. The music video for "Sailing" was released on YouTube on 8 February. The video shows Oldfield and Spiller in the Bahamas on a beach, a boat and in Oldfield's studio there. The song became available to buy on online retailers such as iTunes from 19 February.

Behind the scenes footage and acoustic versions of tracks from the album, including "Man on the Rocks" and "Chariots", were released online ahead of the album. The second single was "Moonshine"; a video was released for purchase on iTunes on 14 April.

"Nuclear" was featured in the E3 2014 trailer and soundtrack for the stealth action game Metal Gear Solid V: The Phantom Pain.

== Critical reception ==
Professional ratings
Aggregate scores
| Source | Rating |
|---|---|
| Metacritic | 51/100 |
Review scores
| Source | Rating |
| The Guardian | 3/5 stars |
| So So Gay | 4.2/5 stars |
| Shields Gazette | 5/10 stars |
| musicOMH | 3/5 stars |
| AllMusic | 3/5 stars |
| Record Collector | 1/5 stars |

Critical reception of the album has been mixed. Music critics and journalists have noted its contrast from Oldfield's progressive rock works such as Tubular Bells, and the album's orientation to more standard rock music. The Guardian newspaper called the album "a curious but likable diversion from his multilayered new-age work." "Sailing" reached BBC Radio 2's "A List" rotation.

=== Weekly charts ===
| Chart (2014) | Peak position |
|---|---|
| Austrian Albums (Ö3 Austria) | 10 |
| Belgian Albums (Ultratop Flanders) | 50 |
| Belgian Albums (Ultratop Wallonia) | 25 |
| Czech Albums (ČNS IFPI) | 2 |
| Danish Albums (Hitlisten) | 15 |
| French Albums (SNEP) | 75 |
| German Albums (Offizielle Top 100) | 3 |
| Hungarian Albums (MAHASZ) | 33 |
| Italian Albums (FIMI) | 37 |
| Dutch Albums (Album Top 100) | 16 |
| Polish Albums (ZPAV) | 7 |
| Scottish Albums (OCC) | 10 |
| Spanish Albums (PROMUSICAE) | 5 |
| Swedish Albums (Sverigetopplistan) | 48 |
| Swiss Albums (Schweizer Hitparade) | 9 |
| UK Albums (OCC) | 12 |

== Track listing ==
=== Disc 1 ===
All tracks written by Mike Oldfield, except where noted.

1. "Sailing" - 4:46
2. "Moonshine" - 5:49
3. "Man on the Rocks" - 6:10
4. "Castaway" - 6:34
5. "Minutes" - 4:51
6. "Dreaming in the Wind" - 5:28
7. "Nuclear" - 5:03
8. "Chariots" - 4:38
9. "Following the Angels" - 7:04
10. "Irene" - 3:59
11. "I Give Myself Away" (William McDowell) - 5:10

=== Disc 2 - Deluxe Edition ===
1. "Sailing" (Instrumental) - 4:44
2. "Moonshine" (Instrumental) - 5:47
3. "Man on the Rocks" (Instrumental) - 6:09
4. "Castaway" (Instrumental) - 6:36
5. "Minutes" (Instrumental) - 4:50
6. "Dreaming in the Wind" (Instrumental) - 5:31
7. "Nuclear" (Instrumental) - 5:02
8. "Chariots" (Instrumental) - 4:24
9. "Following the Angels" (Instrumental) - 7:04
10. "Irene" (Instrumental) - 3:57
11. "I Give Myself Away" (Instrumental) (William McDowell) - 5:06

=== Disc 3 - Bonus Disc (Super Deluxe Edition only) ===
1. "Sailing" (Demo) - 4:14
2. "Moonshine" (Demo) - 5:25
3. "Man on the Rocks" (Demo) - 5:41
4. "Castaway" (Demo) - 6:25
5. "Minutes" (Demo) - 4:29
6. "Dreaming in the Wind" (Demo) - 5:28
7. "Nuclear" (Demo) - 4:55
8. "Chariots" (Demo) - 3:54
9. "Following the Angels" (Demo) - 6:25
10. "Irene" (Demo) - 3:59
11. "I Give Myself Away" (Demo) (William McDowell) - 5:09
12. "Sailing" (Alternative mix) - 4:46
13. "Dreaming in the Wind" (Alternative mix) - 5:29
14. "Following the Angels" (Alternative mix) - 7:05
15. "I Give Myself Away" (Alternative mix) (William McDowell) - 5:09

Disc 3 Tracks 1–11: All Instruments and Vocals by Mike Oldfield

== Personnel ==
- Mike Oldfield – Electric & acoustic guitars, bass guitar, backing vocals, keyboards
- Luke Spiller – Lead vocals
- John Robinson – Drums
- Leland Sklar – Bass guitar
- Matt Rollings – Piano, Hammond B-3
- Michael Thompson – Electric & acoustic guitars
- Stephen Lipson – Electric & acoustic guitars
- Davy Spillane – Whistles on "Moonshine"
- Paul Dooley – Violin on "Moonshine"
- Backing vocalists – Bill Champlin, Alfie Silas Durio, Carmel Echols, Rochelle Gilliard, Judith Hill, Kirsten Joy, Jason Morales, Louis Price, Tiffany Smith
- Engineers – Mike Oldfield & Stephen Lipson (Battery Studios); Howard Willing with Chris Owens (The Village Studios); Steve MacMillan (engineer for drums on "Irene" & "Dreaming in the Wind" at Steak House Studio, LA)
- Produced by – Mike Oldfield and Stephen Lipson
