= William Murray (musician) =

Scottish musician and photographer (1950–1998)

William A. Murray

Background information
- Born: 2 August 1950; Glasgow, Scotland
- Died: 30 August 1998 (aged 48) Dublin, Ireland
- Genres: Progressive folk
- Occupation(s): Drummer, Photographer
- Instrument: Drum
- Years active: 1970s–1990s

William A. Murray (2 August 1950 – 30 August 1998) was a Scottish drummer and photographer.

== Career ==
As a drummer in the early 1970s Murray played with acts including Richard and Linda Thompson's Sour Grapes band and Irish progressive folk band Mellow Candle. In the 1970s Murray played on Kevin Ayers's album Whatevershebringswesing, and later worked with Paul Kossoff.

Murray also worked with the British multi-instrumentalist Mike Oldfield, who bought Murray a camera. Murray worked with Oldfield on albums including Ommadawn, writing the lyrics for "On Horseback". As a photographer he took the cover photo for Kate and Anna McGarrigle’s 1978 album Pronto Monto. He also worked for Time Out.

Murray subsequently became a fashion photographer and moved to Dallas, Texas. In America he formed a band called The Same with Clodagh Simonds, Carter Burwell, Stephen Bray and Chip Johanessen.

Murray took the photograph of Mike Oldfield that appears on the cover of his 1990 album Amarok and wrote a short story for the booklet.

Murray died in 1998 in Dublin, Ireland.
