= Amarok (Mike Oldfield album) =

Studio album by Mike Oldfield
- Released: 21 May 1990
- Recorded: September 1989–March 1990
- Studios: Oldfield's home studio in Roughwood Croft, Chalfont St Giles and CTS Studios, London (choir)
- Genres: Instrumental rock; progressive rock; experimental rock; world
- Length: 60:02
- Label: Virgin
- Producers: Tom Newman; Mike Oldfield

Mike Oldfield chronology
Earth Moving (1989)	Amarok (1990)	Heaven's Open (1991)

Audio
- Amarok on YouTube

Professional ratings
Review scores
Source	Rating
AllMusic	2.5/5 stars

Amarok is the thirteenth studio album by English multi-instrumentalist and songwriter Mike Oldfield, released in May 1990 by Virgin Records. Oldfield originally conceived it as an "angry protest album", showcasing his musical technique. It is presented as a single sixty-minute track of continuous, uninterrupted but constantly changing music.

== Background ==
In July 1989 Oldfield released Earth Moving, his twelfth album for Virgin Records. By this time, his relationship with the label had become increasingly fraught as a result of disagreements over his contract, royalties, and the lack of effort in promoting his albums. Earth Moving was an album whereby he "listened to Virgin totally" in regards to its musical direction, which became a success in continental Europe, but received a disappointing reaction in England, for which Oldfield received "some flak" from Virgin over the matter. Oldfield was now required to deliver two more albums as part of his Virgin contract and in the summer of 1989, he started on one with the aim of pleasing his fans while annoying Virgin executives. Oldfield deemed Amarok his "personal revenge" for Virgin's lack of support.

The idea for Amarok originated in August 1989, when Oldfield recorded a session for broadcast on BBC Radio 1 that included a 7-minute excerpt of his debut album Tubular Bells (1973) performed by himself. Oldfield had fun in the process, which inspired him to make Amarok in such a way. When Oldfield started to write and arrange "Amarok", he ignored the pressures of delivering commercial material for Virgin and instead "let it all come out without any interference [...] I felt I was getting ideas from somewhere inside me, and six months later I had a whole album." He decided upon an album that contained one 60-minute piece which, unlike his previous long tracks, was not split into sections. Such a format would create difficulty for Virgin to market or promote with radio airplay. He avoided letting a theme become something that Virgin might have identified suitable for a single, and developed ideas by "imagining sound, not picture".

Oldfield's contract with Virgin expired on 1 January 1991.

== Recording ==
Amarok was recorded at Oldfield's home studio, then located in Roughwood Croft, a converted coach house in Chalfont St Giles, Buckinghamshire. He assigned Tom Newman as co-producer and engineer, who had worked on Oldfield's debut album Tubular Bells (1973). Oldfield was happy to work with Newman again as he previously worked alone, so having assistance in technical operations allowed him to focus more on the music. He also praised Newman's encouragement to give his best performances. A typical day saw the pair work weekdays from 10 a.m. to around 6 p.m. with weekends off; they purposely avoided alcohol and drugs while making the album.

It was recorded on 48-track and mixed with a Harrison mixing console. Oldfield's decision to combine AMS Neve amplifiers with Brüel & Kjær microphones made the album "sound much better than anything I've done". It marked a departure from the sound of his recent albums from the 1980s as he avoided his Fairlight CMI computer and C-Lab sequencer and used little of his synthesisers. He acquired a 1908 baby grand piano, played Hammond, Farfisa, and Lowrey organs and used real percussion instruments. For some sections he created bass and snare drum sounds by hitting his thighs with his hands that were fed into an AMS system.

== Music ==
Oldfield's previous works featured the artist playing a wide variety of instruments. This continued with Amarok, including (in the spirit of techniques such as bricolage and the ethos of musique concrète) a number of items such as shoes, spoons, a Hoover vacuum cleaner and the "contents of aeromodeller's toolbox". Though tubular bells are used on the album, they are listed as "long thin metallic hanging tubes" in the liner notes.

Oldfield said Amarok does not fit into the new age genre as "it kicks you in the arse occasionally".

The work has many influences from African music, mainly through the use of both vocal and percussion elements.

Two of the album's sections, "Mandolin Reprise" and "Africa I: Far dip", feature Oldfield's processed "caveman" voice, first used on Tubular Bells – i.e. him shouting partly unintelligible words into the microphone while running the tape at a much higher speed than normal, which resulted in a significantly lowered vocal pitch when played back at normal speed. Various other sections include short samples of Oldfield talking, and the "Intermission" section consists of multi-tracked and delayed recordings of his voice reciting the list of instruments played on the album, at a low volume level.

The final section of "Amarok" features Janet Brown's impersonation of former British Prime Minister Margaret Thatcher.

=== Comparison to Ommadawn ===
Oldfield's original concept was to make Amarok a sequel to his third album, Ommadawn (1975). Despite Virgin suggesting to rename the album Tubular Bells II based on its style and strength of the music, Oldfield refused and later said: "if anything, it's Ommadawn II". Many of the people who were involved in the creation of Ommadawn—Jabula, Clodagh Simonds, Bridget St John and Paddy Moloney—also appear on the album.

In addition, William Murray, who co-wrote the song "On Horseback" for Ommadawn, photographed the Amarok cover photo and wrote the short story included in the liner notes. Murray used David Bailey's Ommadawn cover photograph as an inspiration, and Tom Newman created the brass lettering that accompanies the photograph on the album cover.

Oldfield has said that Amarok was an experiment to see whether he could again create an album without the aid of computers, which he had used increasingly in his work. He said that he wanted to focus more on the musicianship, playing all of the instruments himself, by hand. However, slightly contrarily, he has also discussed the role that Amiga computers had in the album's creation.

== Title and packaging ==
Of the album's name, Oldfield has said: "It doesn't have a real meaning but it's similar to many Gaelic words, like those for morning or happy. And if you split the letters up, you get Am-a-rok... it could mean: am a rock. Maybe that implies I don't want to change anything by following trends." "Amarok" is phonetically identical to the 3,000 years old Irish language word "amárach", meaning "tomorrow". Some scholars have suggested that the word "amárach", itself evolved over time from an original suggestive meaning of "brightness to come" or "light that will arrive in the near future".

To promote the album, Oldfield spent his own money organising a mailing list for fans who purchased tickets to his shows through Visa and those who had signed up for additional information on Amarok. For them, he offered a £1,000 prize of his own money to the first person to find the hidden message that he had incorporated into the music. The message is a Morse code sequence made from synthesized trumpets, located 48:04 minutes into the piece, that spells out "FUCK OFF RB", a reference to Virgin founder Richard Branson, who had signed Oldfield to the label in 1973. The contest did not receive a winner.

In a parody of listening instructions on the sleeve of Tubular Bells, the album's back cover reads: "HEALTH WARNING – This record could be hazardous to the health of cloth-eared nincompoops. If you suffer from this condition, consult your Doctor immediately".

=== Lyrics excerpts ===
- The "Sondela" finale of "Africa III" (from 58:44 to 60:02, the end), sung in the Xhosa language:

" Sondela / uSomandla / sukuma / wena / obengezela. "

Come closer / the Almighty / arise / you / shining one.
(Come closer to us, o Almighty: arise, you who shines.)

== Release ==
In Australia the album was released in a double pack with Tubular Bells.

The album was not promoted with singles or a concert tour; Oldfield agreed to several interviews and radio commercials on BBC Radio 1.

=== Live performance ===
Although Oldfield has never performed the work live in its entirety, a duo comprising American pianist Gus Fogle and bassist Jason Miller performed the piece in April 2012, after it had been transcribed note for note by Welsh composer and arranger Ryan Yard.

== Quotes ==
I am told that when men hear its voice, it stays in their ears, they cannot be rid of it. It has many different voices: some happy, but others sad. It roars like a baboon, murmurs like a child, drums like the blazing arms of one thousand drummers, rustles like water in a glass, sings like a lover and laments like a priest...

— William Murray, From the short story included in the liner notes.

== Track listing ==
No.	Title	Length
1.	"Amarok: 1. "Fast Riff (intro)" (0:00); 2. "Intro" (2:32); 3. "Climax I (12 Strings)" (5:46); 4. "Soft Bodhran Pt. 1" (6:18); 5. "Rachmaninov Pt. 1" (7:20); 6. "Soft Bodhran Pt. 2" (8:35); 7. "Rachmaninov Pt. 2" (9:29); 8. "Roses" (9:56); 9. "Intro (reprise 1)" (10:42); 10. "Scot" (11:13); 11. "Didlybom" (13:16); 12. "Mad Bit Pt. 1" (14:59); 13. "Russian" (15:56); 14. "Hoover" (16:10); 15. "Fast Riff" (18:00); 16. "Lion" (19:57); 17. "Fast Waltz Pt. 1" (21:57); 18. "Stop" (23:42); 19. "Mad Bit Pt. 2" (24:33); 20. "Fast Waltz Pt. 2" (24:46); 21. "Mandolin" (25:06); 22. "Intermission" (26:07); 23. "Boat Pt. 1" (26:23); 24. "Intro (reprise 2 Pt. 1)" (29:27); 25. "Intro (reprise 2 Pt. 2)" (29:59); 26. "Big Roses" (32:07); 27. "Green Green" (33:13); 28. "Slow Waltz" (34:24); 29. "Lion (reprise)" (36:04); 30. "Mandolin (reprise 1)" (37:04); 31. "TV-am" (38:45); 32. "Mandolin (reprise 2)" (39:16); 33. "Fast Riff (reprise)" (39:49); 34. "Hoover/Scot" (41:03); 35. "Boat Pt. 2" (42:22); 36. "12 Strings (reprise) " (43:33); 37. "Intro Waltz" (43:49); 38. "Green (reprise) " (44:12); 39. "Africa I: Far Build" (44:46); 40. "Africa I: Far Dip" (48:02); 41. "Africa I: Pre Climax" (48:46); 42. "Africa I: 12 Climax" (49:33); 43. "Africa I: Climax Pt. 1" (50:24); 44. "Africa II: Bridge Pt. 1" (51:00); 45. "Africa II: Riff" (51:17); 46. "Africa II: Boats Pt. 3" (51:34); 47. "Africa II: Bridge Pt. 2" (51:52); 48. "Africa II: Climax Pt. 2" (52:10); 49. "Africa III: Hello Everyone" (54:23); 50. "Africa III: Choir" (55:50); 51. "Africa III: Recorder" (57:30); 52. "Africa III: Happy" (58:14); 53. "Africa III: Finale" (58:43)"	60:02

== Personnel ==
- Mike Oldfield – acoustic bass guitar, acoustic guitar, banjo, bass guitar, bass whistles, bouzouki (misspelled in the liner notes as "bazouki"), bell tree, bodhran, bowed guitar, cabasa, classical guitar, electric guitars, keyboards, effects, Farfisa, Lowrey and Vox organs, Flamenco guitar, glockenspiel (misspelled in the liner notes as "glockenspeil"), high-string guitar, jaw harp, kalimba, mandolin, marimba, melodica, Northumbrian bagpipes, penny whistles, percussion, piano, psaltery, rototom, sitar guitar (a Coral electric sitar), spinet, timpani, tubular bells (listed as "long thin metallic hanging tubes"), twelve-string guitar, ukulele, violin, vocals, and wonga box.
- Janet Brown – voice of "Margaret Thatcher"
- Jabula – African choir and percussion
- Paddy Moloney – tin whistle
- Clodagh Simonds – vocals
- Bridget St John – vocals
- Tom Newman – producer and engineer.

== Album promo samplers ==
=== Amarok Sampler ===
Amarok Sampler is a promotional CD-Maxi released in Germany in May 1990 including 5 excerpts from the album, with catalogue number 663,271,000.

1. "Amarok" (3:09) excerpt I
2. "Amarok" (3:22) excerpt II
3. "Amarok" (9:30) excerpt III
4. "Amarok" (1:53) excerpt IV
5. "Amarok" (2:29) excerpt V

=== Amarok X-Trax ===
Amarok X-Trax 3 track promo CD from the British retailer W H Smith that was packaged with their in-store magazine, Insight.

Amarok X-Trax is the name of two promotional CD-Maxis, one issued in the UK with the catalogue number AMACD 1DJ, and one given away free with W H Smith's in-store magazine Insight, catalogue number AMACD 1. The WH Smith version included I, II & V from AMACD 1DJ.

1. "Amarok" (3:05) excerpt I
2. "Amarok" (4:16) excerpt II
3. "Amarok" (3:47) excerpt III
4. "Amarok" (5:18) excerpt IV
5. "Amarok" (5:38) excerpt V

== Charts ==
The album did not chart very highly, but managed to enter the top 50 in various European countries.

Chart (1990)	Position
Austrian Albums (Ö3 Austria)	26
German Albums (Offizielle Top 100)	16
Dutch Albums (Album Top 100)	66
Spanish Albums (PROMUSICAE)	27
Swedish Albums (Sverigetopplistan)	50
Swiss Albums (Schweizer Hitparade)	30
UK Albums (Official Charts)	49
