= Les Penning =

British folk musician

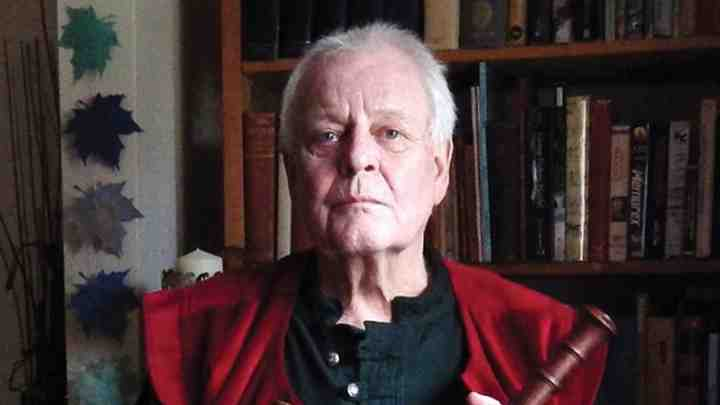
- Penning in 2014
- Born: Leslie Penning; 14 December 1944 (age 81); Wiltshire, England
- Occupations: Musician; Composer; Producer
- Years active: 1975–present
- Musical career
- Genres: Rock; pop; Folk
- Instruments: Recorder; Kortholt; Crumhorn; Cornamuse; Bowed psaltery; Gemshorn; Irish whistle; Keyboards

Les Penning is a British musician and composer, best known for his work with Mike Oldfield on the album Ommadawn and several of Oldfield's singles. He is credited with introducing Oldfield to medieval music through their time playing together at Penrhos Court. He has worked with many other artists, playing woodwind, as producer or as recording engineer, and has created radio drama for BBC Hereford and Worcester and music for two S4C television series: Gwydion and an adaption by Gareth Miles of the William John Griffith novel Storïau'r Henllys Fawr. In 1978 he was a musician and performer on the BBC adaptation of ‘Kilvert’s Diary’. He has appeared at Leominster Festival playing medieval music as "Leslie Penning and Company"

In 1977 he was given the title of Sir Les Penning, Master of the King's Music, by Richard Booth, the King of Hay. He has recently worked on several projects in collaboration with Robert Reed including "Doctor Who Theme" and "Sanctuary II" and his albums Belerion, Return to Penrhos, and The Ringmaster Part One and Two.

== Discography ==
Albums

- The Worldes Goodnyte (2007)
- Througham Slad's Lost Sessions (2014) with Mike Oldfield (unofficial release)
- Belerion (2016) with Robert Reed, Phil Bates, and Miguel Engel de la LLave Jiménez
- Return to Penrhos (2019) with Robert Reed and Tom Newman
- Pipes of Penning (2021) with Robert Reed
- The Last Bells of Winter (2021) with Robert Reed
- The Goat of Christmas Past (2021) with Robert Reed

Singles and EPs

- Cuckoo Song with Mike Oldfield, Virgin, 1977
- The British Grenadiers, Polydor Records, 1977
- The Hay National Anthem, Hay Gramophone Gesellschaft, 1977
- Should Have Been Forever, Plant Life Records, 1983
- Willow Fair, Plant Life Records, 1983
- Sussex Carol (with Rob Reed), 2016
- In Dulci Jubilo (with Rob Reed), 2018
- The Floral Dance (with Rob Reed), 2019

As a contributing artist

- Ommadawn, Virgin Records, 1975 – Recorder, Conductor
- In Dulci Jubilo, Virgin, 1975
- Portsmouth, Virgin, 1976 – Recorders and feet
- Argiers, Virgin, 1976
- Echo & the Bunnymen, Heaven Up Here, 1981
- Harmony Revival, Original Copy (LP), Ellie Jay Records, 1981
- Robert Reed, Sanctuary III (LP, Album), Plane Groovy, 2018
- Theme from Doctor Who (with Robert Reed and Tom Newman), 2016
- Robert Reed, The Ringmaster Part One and Two, Tigermoth Productions, 2021
- Tubular World, Hergest Ridge 50th Anniversary Edition,2021
- The Weever Sands, Secrets of the Pecking Order, 2022
- The Weever Sands, Moonfish: Songs Of Love And Water, 2024

== Other music industry work ==
- BBC Hereford and Worcester – Radio Drama The Hall of Mysteries
- S4C television series: Gwyddion and Storïau'r Henllys Fawr (composer)
- BBC series: Kilvert’s Diary (musician and performer), 1978
