= Ommadawn =

Studio album by Mike Oldfield
- Released: 7 November 1975
- Recorded: January–September 1975
- Studio: The Beacon, Kington, Herefordshire; The Manor, Shipton-on-Cherwell, Oxfordshire (African drums)
- Genre: Progressive rock; new-age
- Length: 36:41
- Label: Virgin
- Producer: Mike Oldfield

Mike Oldfield chronology
The Orchestral Tubular Bells (1975)	Ommadawn (1975)	Incantations (1978)

Singles from Ommadawn
- 1. "In Dulci Jubilo"/"On Horseback" Released: 14 November 1975

Ommadawn is the third studio album by English musician, multi-instrumentalist and songwriter Mike Oldfield, released on 7 November 1975 on Virgin Records.

Ommadawn peaked at No. 4 on the UK Albums Chart, No. 74 in Canada, and No. 146 on the US Billboard 200. The song that concludes "Ommadawn (Part Two)", entitled "On Horseback", was released as a single in November 1975 with Oldfield's non-album track "In Dulci Jubilo". The album reached gold certification by the British Phonographic Industry within two months, signifying 100,000 copies sold. In 2010, Mercury Records issued a remastered edition containing new stereo and 5.1 surround sound mixes by Oldfield and extra material. Oldfield had wanted to make Amarok (1990) a sequel album to Ommadawn, but the idea was not realised until he released Return to Ommadawn (2017).

== Background and recording ==
By the end of 1974, Oldfield had been propelled to worldwide fame by the unexpected critical and commercial success of his debut studio album, Tubular Bells (1973). He followed it with Hergest Ridge (1974), which generated a more negative critical reaction in comparison. That disappointed him, but led to a creative period as he vowed to deliver a follow-up that was "worthwhile and successful", proving that he was not a one-hit wonder with the success of Tubular Bells. When Oldfield started to work on new music for Ommadawn, he wanted to avoid professional studios and persuaded his label, Virgin Records, to install a 24-track studio at The Beacon, his home near Kington, Herefordshire. Oldfield recorded Ommadawn at The Beacon between January and September 1975; the African drums were recorded at The Manor in Shipton-on-Cherwell, Oxfordshire, where Oldfield had recorded Tubular Bells and Hergest Ridge, and which was chosen due to there not being enough space at The Beacon to accommodate the additional instruments and equipment. Oldfield is credited as the album's sole producer and engineer.

Oldfield's mother died shortly after Oldfield had started recording. Later, he recalled that working on his new music at that point provided the only source of comfort for him. He faced a serious technical issue several months in: having almost finished recording side one, the recording tape started to shed its oxide layer, causing irreparable damage. Virgin delivered a machine so that copies of the master tape could be made and Oldfield could carry on working, but the same problem recurred, leaving him with no choice but to start again using a new brand of tape. He believed that the many overdubs he had put down on the track had worn it out.

Oldfield initially felt depressed at having to start again, but then noticed that "something clicked inside of me" and realised that his previous takes had been good practice for the final ones. "All the musical pieces fell into place and the results sounded marvellous." The original version of side one was released on the 2010 remaster as "Ommadawn (Lost Version)". Excerpts from the scrapped version were used in Oldfield's interview on Tony Palmer's documentary series All You Need is Love and in the 1977 film Reflection.

The cover photograph was taken by David Bailey. The album's title was chosen at the end of the production process. Oldfield spotted a collection of words that Irish musician Clodagh Simonds had made up, one of them being ommadawn, and decided to use that. In 1975 he rejected a claim that the title came from the Irish Gaelic word amadán or omadhaun, meaning "fool", but later said that it did mean "idiot."

== Music ==
As with Oldfield's first two albums, Ommadawn is a single same-titled composition divided into Part One and Part Two, each designated to a single side of the LP. "Ommadawn (Part One)" has a length of 19:23 and "Ommadawn (Part Two)" runs for 17:17. The latter ends with a song entitled "On Horseback", written by Oldfield and lyrics by Oldfield and William Murray and, while it was branded separately on vinyl from "Ommadawn (Part Two)", it was only referred to as "the horse song" in the liner notes, only properly credited by name on its accompanying single and on remastered copies of the album released from the 2010s onward. The song relates to Oldfield, Murray, and Leslie Penning's time on horseback along Hergest Ridge.

Most of the instruments that Oldfield played on the album are shown in a photograph featured on his compilation set Boxed (1976).

== Album title and lyrics ==
In his autobiography, Changeling, Oldfield states that he just wanted "sounds", not "sensible" lyrics. He asked Clodagh Simonds, an Irish musician with whom he was working, to come up with something in Irish. She wrote down the first words that came into her head:

Daddy's in bed, The cat's drinking milk, I'm an idiot, And I'm laughing.

Oldfield states that Simonds had telephoned a relative or friend to translate these words into Irish for the song. As the album, like many of Oldfield's at that time, did not have a lyrics sheet, attempts were made to decipher the lyrics; one such attempt which has persisted over the years was:

Ab yul ann idyad awt
En yab na log a toc na awd
Taw may on omma dawn ekyowl
Omma dawn ekyowl

These lyrics are written in an English-based respelling system, but all four lines are easily recognisable as an Irish translation of the English words, although the first two lines have undergone a process of partial scrambling: combinations of vowel + semivowel are kept intact, but otherwise the lines are written backwards (so, e.g., idyad awt corresponds to taw daydi) and some word spaces have been changed. In standard Irish orthography, the lyrics are (with English translation, since the translation does not match the original exactly):

Tá daidí 'na leaba Tá an cat ag ól an bhainne Tá mé an amadán ag ceol Amadán ag ceol	Daddy's in his bed The cat's drinking the milk I'm the idiot singing (or the singing idiot); Idiot singing (or singing idiot)

The word idiot (amadán in Irish) was Anglicised into Ommadawn and used as the title of the album. Prior to his autobiography, Oldfield had denied this meaning of ommadawn, calling it a nonsense word, apparently as a ruse to enhance the mystery of his music.

== Related releases ==
Professional ratings
Review scores
Source	Rating
AllMusic	4/5 stars

In November 1975, Oldfield's non-album track "In Dulci Jubilo" was released with "On Horseback" on the B-side. It went on to peak at No. 4 on the UK singles chart in January 1976.

In 1976, an SQ quadraphonic mix of Ommadawn was released on Oldfield's compilation album Boxed.

In May 1977, the Liffey Light Orchestra performed the album live at Trinity College in Dublin. Oldfield did not tour until 1979; he started to perform excerpts from the album from 1980 onwards.

Paul Stump, in his 1997 History of Progressive Rock, said that "the technically and emotionally polymathic Ommadawn operates on several levels at once, not least because Oldfield states two themes rather than one near the beginning and doesn't try to develop them sequentially over fifty minutes but allows each its space to breathe and display itself, both singularly and with the other." He also praised the album's harmonics and greater economy of expression as compared to Oldfield's first two albums.

Excerpts from Ommadawn appeared in the NASA film The Space Movie (1979). A small portion of Part One was used as the theme to the children's TV show Jackanory on occasions when John Grant narrated his Littlenose stories.

Oldfield had initial ideas to make his later album Amarok (1990) as a sequel to Ommadawn, but the idea fell through. He did not revisit the idea until 2015 when he started recording a true sequel, Return to Ommadawn (2017).

== 2010 reissues ==
In June 2010, Ommadawn was reissued as Deluxe Edition by Mercury Records as part of Oldfield's remastered album series for the label. The set includes a restored cover artwork, new stereo and 5.1 surround sound mixes completed by Oldfield and bonus material, including the early version of Part One that was scrapped and "In Dulci Jubilo", "First Excursion", "Argiers", and "Portsmouth".

Also in 2010, a limited edition 180-gram vinyl was released as a part of the Back to Black series. The digital edition contains the content from the two CDs of the Deluxe Edition. The Japanese release features the Super High Material CD format.

A limited edition box set of the album was also released in 2010, containing the Deluxe Edition set, a vinyl pressing, and a numbered and signed print of the artwork. The set saw 250 copies made and sold through Oldfield's official website.

== Track listing ==
All music by Mike Oldfield.

Side one
No.	Title	Length
1.	"Ommadawn (Part One)"	19:23

Side two
No.	Title	Length
1.	"Ommadawn (Part Two)"	17:17

== Personnel ==
Credits are adapted from the 1975 LP liner notes.

=== Musicians ===
- Mike Oldfield – electric and acoustic guitars and basses (including 12-string guitar and classical guitar), mandolin, bouzouki, banjo, harp, spinet, grand piano, electric organs, synthesisers, glockenspiel, bodhran, assorted percussion
- Herbie (Christopher Herbert) – Northumbrian smallpipes
- Leslie Penning – recorders, The Hereford City Band conductor
- Terry Oldfield – panpipes
- Pierre Moerlen – timpani
- David Strange – cello
- Don Blakeson – trumpet
- Julian Bahula – African drums
- Ernest Mothle – African drums
- Lucky Ranku – African drums
- Eddie Tatane – African drums
- Clodagh Simonds – vocals
- Bridget St John – vocals
- Sally Oldfield – vocals
- The Penrhos Kids (Abigail, Briony, Ivan, and Jason Griffiths) – vocals on "On Horseback"
- The Hereford City Band – brass section
- William Murray – percussion
- Paddy Moloney – Uilleann pipes

=== Production ===
- Mike Oldfield – producer, engineer
- David Bailey – cover photographs
- Phil Smee – CD package design (2010 remaster)

== Certifications ==
Region	Certification	Certified units/sales
Netherlands (NVPI)	Gold	50,000^{^}
United Kingdom (BPI)	Gold	100,000^{^}
^{^} Shipments figures based on certification alone.
