= Magenta (Welsh band) =

Welsh progressive rock band

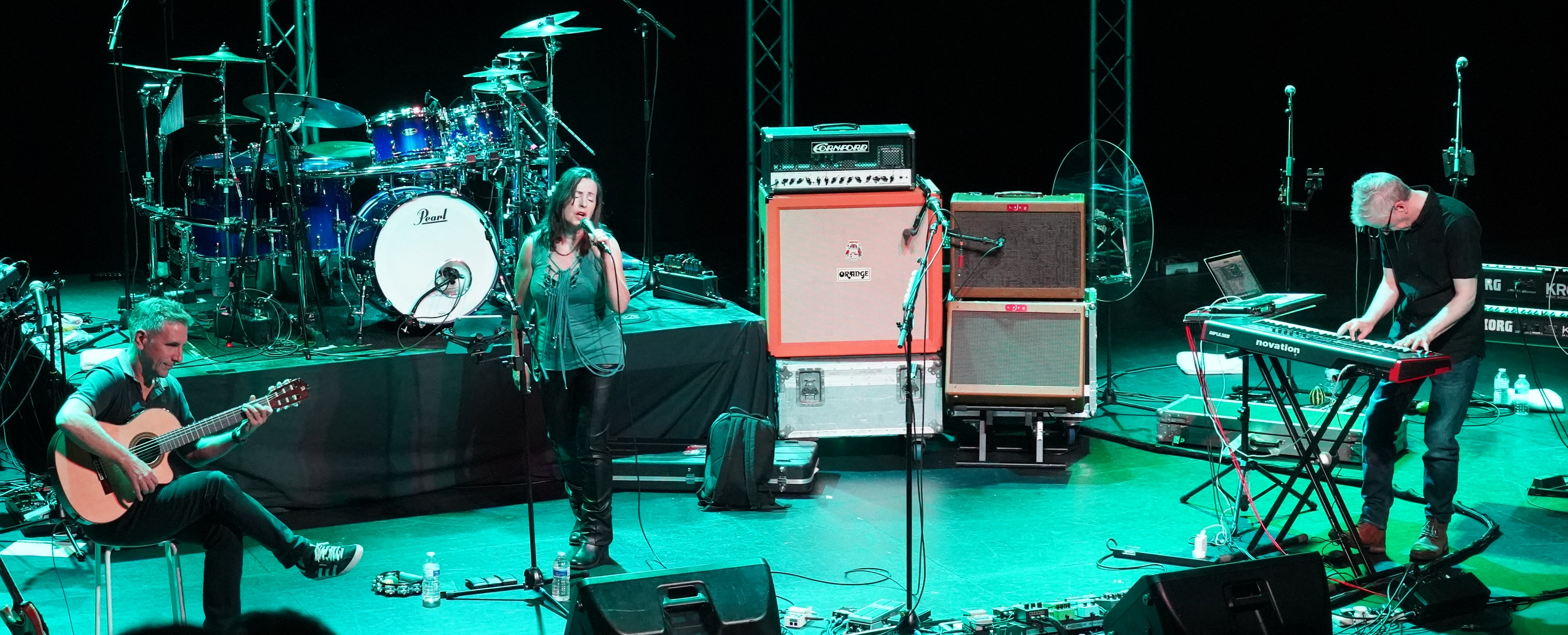
- Magenta in 2025

Background information
- Origin: Wales, UK
- Genres: Progressive rock
- Years active: 1999-present
- Label: Tigermoth
- Members: Christina Booth, Rob Reed, Chris Fry, Dan Fry, Aled Lloyd
- Past members: Rhys Jones (drums) Allan Mason-Jones (drums) Martin Rosser (guitar) Matt Cohen (bass) Colin Edwards (guitar) Keiran Bailey (drums) Steve Roberts (drums) Dan Nelson (bass) 'Jiffy' Griffiths (drums)

Magenta are a Welsh progressive rock band formed in 1999 by ex-Cyan member Rob Reed. Reed takes his influences from artists such as Renaissance, Genesis, Mike Oldfield, Yes, Eurythmics and Björk.

== Current lineup ==
- Christina Booth: lead vocals.
- Rob Reed: keyboards, backing vocals.
- Chris Fry: lead electric and acoustic guitars, backing vocals.

Guest musicians are brought in to play other instruments during recording sessions. The current live band as of March 2024 consists of the above three members plus:

- Dan Fry: bass
- Aled Lloyd: drums

== History ==
Although heavily influenced by progressive rock, Reed is a professional songwriter and has done many other projects for both film and television. The most successful of these projects was called Trippa, featuring Christina Booth on vocals and Rob Reed on guitars and keyboards. Reed asked Christina to be lead vocalist for a progressive rock project he had in mind, and the initial ideas for Magenta were born. Booth previously was guest on a number of Cyan albums providing backing vocals.

In late 1999, Reed started writing for what would become Magenta's debut release, Revolutions. Reed wanted to do something new, bigger and more conceptual. "Current prog bands are always scared and shy about admitting the influences of the great bands of the 70's, and I wanted to come clean and admit and celebrate those influences, and hopefully create something as worthwhile as those classic bands" said Reed. "To do this, all I had to do was to give priority to melody rather than technical showmanship, something I have always tried to do with all my work." Revolutions was named "Best New Album" in 2001 by Musical Discoveries, an online resource for female vocalists in the music industry.

Magenta's second album, Seven was released in March 2004 and sold out of its first pressing within four weeks. The band's first single, "Broken" was released in June 2004 – from the EP Broken. While shorter than any of the epic tracks on Seven, Broken retains the classic prog rock sound of Magenta, with a slightly more modern edge.

In November 2004, Magenta released the double live album Another Time, Another Place, recorded on tour in Europe from 2002 to 2004. The live concert DVD The Gathering was also released in late 2005 and a series of live shows followed.

Magenta's third studio album, Home, was officially released on 1 June 2006. The album is a concept piece and tells the story of a woman who emigrates from Liverpool, England in the early 1970s to "find herself" in the USA. The CD is 68 minutes long and includes contributions from a variety of guests including Magenta regulars Martin Shellard on guitar alongside Troy Donockley (Iona, Mostly Autumn) on Uilleann Pipes and whistles. Once again, the album was written and produced by Rob Reed, with lyrics by Steve Reed. Musically, Home represents a further development for the band, combining the Magenta sound established on Revolutions, Seven and the two singles Broken and I'm Alive. The new album was released in two separate versions, the single disc Home and the double disc version featuring the New York Suite. The second disc contains four longer pieces of music which could not fit onto the single disc version. Home was later re-released as a double album, with the four tracks from the New York Suite inserted into the relevant position in the "story".

Magenta: The Singles was released in summer 2007. The album features re-recorded versions of various singles and album tracks. Rob Reed explains, "The first reason for doing the album was to get definitive versions of the songs recorded. We’d been playing some of the songs live for 3 years and we now had Dan on bass, and he’d brought his own character to the songs as they’d developed. Also, the original versions had been recorded quite quickly and we wanted to get high quality versions of the songs down, as we’d done with "Speechless". It was great to take a bit more time with them and record them properly. Also a lot of Prog fans don't like buying singles, they’d much rather have the album format, and at 79 minutes we certainly have an album's worth of material. We can delete the singles now."

In addition, another DVD Live at the Point was recorded on 23 November at The Point in Cardiff.

On 30 November 2007 it was announced that drummer Allan Mason-Jones had left the live version of the band. He was replaced in the live band by Keiran Bailey. On 11 December 2007 it was announced that rhythm guitarist Martin Rosser had also left the band to work with Dan Fry and Allan Mason-Jones on their new C-Sides project.

Their fourth album, entitled "Metamorphosis", was released to registered fans on 23 March 2008, with an accompanying DVD featuring footage of the recording process and a full 5.1 version of the album. (The official release date for these items was 21 April.) Prior to its release, Reed said it was "unlike what Magenta fans have heard up until now." The album contains just four tracks, two of which are longer than 20 minutes. The album has a much darker edge than previous Magenta albums.

In November 2009, Magenta performed an acoustic concert at Peter Gabriel's Real World Studios near Bath. The concert was notable for featuring a wind section, and the one-off return of Martin Rosser on rhythm guitar – Colin Edwards having recently departed the band. The concert Live at Real World was released as a double CD and DVD in September 2010.

On 4 March 2010, it was announced on the Magenta homepage that bassist Dan Fry had left the live band, to pursue his MLE project. This caused two shows in the Netherlands set for May to be cancelled, and the band went on an extended hiatus while other projects were being worked on, such as Christina Booth's and Chris Fry's solo albums.

Magenta returned to the live scene at the Summer's End Festival in October 2011, with Dan Nelson and Steve Roberts (from Godsticks) on bass and drums respectively.

Magenta's fifth album, Chameleon, was released in November 2011. It features several shorter tracks but mostly with a hard edge, similar to the previous album Metamorphosis. At this time, Magenta's full members were confirmed to be Rob Reed, Christina Booth and Chris Fry, with other musicians brought in for studio recordings and live gigs. Kieran Bailey recorded drums on the album but no longer played with the live version of the band.

Their sixth album, The Twenty Seven Club was released in 2013. This features six tracks dedicated to musicians who died at the age of 27, including Jim Morrison, Brian Jones, Janis Joplin, Amy Winehouse, Kurt Cobain and Robert Johnson. See 27 Club.

Following the release of We are Legend, in April 2017, containing just three tracks, all of them developing musical themes and influences beyond 10 minutes each, Magenta released a new CD/DVD live compilation We are Seven in 2018, with the performance of two complete albums for the first time live: The awards winning 2004 album Seven and Magenta's latest album We Are Seven. For the occasion, the band are augmented by additional flute and oboe players.

In July 2019 a new version of the Home album was released. About this new recording, Rob Reed declared in Magenta's website: "During the preparation for the Magenta 20th Anniversary shows, we decided to include a large selection from the underperformed HOME album. Having to recreate the tracks, meant having to re-visit the multi-tracks which were in a mess. Not being able to resist a 'tinker' with the tracks, I ended up re-working the multitrack. Solving problems in the arrangements, adding fresh dynamics and colours. Keeping what was good about the original, the vocals which are amazing, but re-working the backing tracks. Adding new things, and then taking away anything that did not earn its keep from the regional recordings. We were also very lucky to have Pete Jones (Tiger Moth Tales) to play saxophone on the track "Moving On", like he did at the recent Magenta 20th Anniversary Show. The result I think is a more dynamic and atmospheric interpretation of what we looking to achieve. I hope you enjoy..".

Summer 2020 saw the release of the album Masters of Illusion, a concept album based on the Hammer House of Horror films. Musically it's very much a hark back to the first two Genesis- and Yes-influenced Revolutions and Seven.

Autumn 2022 saw the release of the album The White Witch – A Symphonic Trilogy, an orchestral re-imagining of the songs "The White Witch" from Revolutions (Sacrifice), "Lust" from Seven (Retribution) plus a new piece entitled Survival.

A number of singles, EP's, compilations, live albums and DVD's have been released by the band, going back to 2004.

Magenta have played at many rock festivals, including Summer's End, Winter's End, Celebr8, Fusion, Cambridge Rock Festival and Danfest in the UK, Baja Prog in Mexico, and Night of the Prog in Loreley, Germany.

== Side projects ==
Rob Reed's previous project, Cyan, took to the stage for the first time to play at the Summer's End Festival in September 2012. The live band featured the Magenta live line-up, but with Steffan Rhys Williams replacing Christina Booth on lead vocals. A new lineup featuring Tiger Moth Tales/Red Bazar/Camel musician Peter Jones was formed, re-recording the debut album For King And Country in 2021 and performing it live. A brand new album Pictures From The Other Side was released in 2023.

In April 2015, Rob Reed and Christina Booth collaborated with Big Big Train's David Longdon and Nick D’Virgilio, Steven Wilson band's Nick Beggs and Steve Hackett (ex Genesis) on a new version of Hackett's 1979 instrumental track "Spectral Mornings", with new lyrics written by David Longdon, in support of the Parkinson's Society UK.

Christina Booth has, as of March 2024, released three solo albums: Broken Lives And Bleeding Hearts (2010), The Light (2015), and Bar Stool Prophet (2023).

Chris Fry released his solo album Composed in 2012, consisting of acoustic guitar instrumentals.

== Awards ==
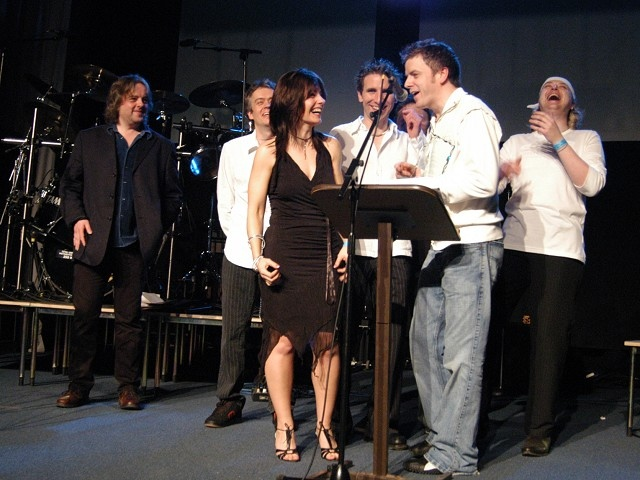
Magenta at the CRS Awards (2004)

In 2004, Magenta received the Classic Rock Society Award for "Best Female Vocalist" and "Best Live Band". The Classic Rock Society (CRS) honours groups or artists who are popular with the public, but whose music remains unpublicised by national media and radio station programmers. Other past contributors and recipients have included Pallas, IQ, Spock's Beard, Flower Kings, Mostly Autumn, Karnataka, Pendragon and many others from the progressive rock genre.

- Best Live Gig – Classic Rock Society 2004, 2008 and 2012
- Best Band – Classic Rock Society 2005, 2008
- Best Album – Seven – Metal Hammer, Poland
- Best Live Album – Hungarian Prog Rock Society 2005
- Best Foreign Album – Home – Italian Prog Awards 2006
- Best Female Vocalist – Christina Booth – CRS 2004, 2005, 2006, 2007, 2008, 2009, 2011 and 2012
- Best Guitarist – Chris Fry – CRS 2008 and 2012
- Rob Reed's Kompendium project – Beneath The Waves – won the CRS Best Album Award 2012

== Discography ==
=== Studio ===
- Revolutions (1 March 2001)
- Seven (1 March 2004)
- Home (1 June 2006)
- New York Suite (1 June 2006)
- The Singles (21 May 2007)
- Metamorphosis (21 April 2008)
- Seven : The Instrumentals : exclusive download release (3 January 2010)
- Rarities Vol 1 : exclusive download release (5 January 2010)
- Home : re-released & remixed 2-CD set combining the songs from Home and New York Suite in the originally intended order (20 March 2010)
- Chameleon (10 November 2011)
- Chameleon : The Instrumentals : exclusive download release (6 December 2011)
- The Twenty Seven Club (2 September 2013)
- We Are Legend (April 2017)
- Masters of Illusion (1 July 2020)
- The White Witch (October 2022)
- Tarot (10 April 2026)

=== Live ===
- Another Time, Another Place...Live (1 November 2004)
- Live at the Point (27 October 2008)
- The Gathering – Exclusive download release (January 2010)
- Live at Real World (19 September 2010) – Acoustic concert with a string quartet
- Live: On Our Way to Who Knows Where (2012)
- Chaos From The Stage (2016)
- We Are Seven (26 October 2018)
- Reaching for the Moon (7 April 2023)

=== EPs ===
- Broken (1 June 2004)
- I'm Alive (1 November 2004)
- Wonderous Stories (15 November 2009): cover of the Yes song plus instrumental and acoustic mixes
- The Lizard King (August 2013): single edit, acoustic mix and extended version of "The Lizard King" from the album The Twenty Seven Club
- Trojan E.P. (April 2017): single edit and Chimpan A remix of "Trojan" from the album We Are Legend; and Chimpan A remix of "Look Around"

=== DVDs ===
- The Gathering (24 October 2005)
- The Metamorphosis Collection (21 April 2008)
- Live at the Point (27 October 2008)
- Live at Real World (19 September 2010)
- Chaos from the stage (12 November 2016)
- We Are Seven (26 October 2018)
- Reaching for the Moon (7 April 2023)
- Live on a Knife Edge (10 April 2026)

=== Collaborations ===
- Spectral Mornings 2015 (27 April 2015) – charity single in aid of Parkinson's Society UK. Christina Booth and Rob Reed of Magenta, with Nick Beggs, Nick D’Virgilio, Steve Hackett, and Dave Longdon.

=== Robert Reed solo albums ===
n.b.

- Sanctuary (2014)
- Sanctuary II (2016)
- Variations on Themes By David Bedford (2017)
- Sanctuary Live (2017)
- Sanctuary III (2018)
- Cursus 123 430 (2020)
- Cursus: A Symphonic Poem (2020)
- The Ringmaster Part One (2021)
- The Ringmaster Part Two (2022)
- Sanctuary Live at Newbury (2023)
- Sanctuary Covered (2024)
