= Portsmouth (instrumental) =

Traditional English folk dance tune

Song
- Published: 1701 (in The Dancing Master)
- Genre: Traditional English folk
- Composer: Unknown

"Portsmouth" is a traditional English folk dance tune, similar to an Irish or Scottish hornpipe melody. It is sometimes referred to as the "Portsmouth Hornpipe".

"Portsmouth" appeared in the 11th edition of John Playford's The Dancing Master in 1701. It is also one of the three arrangements on which English composer Ralph Vaughan Williams based his Sea Songs, originally arranged for military band in 1923 as the second movement of his English Folk Song Suite, and subsequently re-arranged for full orchestra in 1942 by the composer. In the 1950s and early 60s it was used as the signature tune for BBC television series Billy Bunter, at the end of the show's run in electronic form. A version by Mike Oldfield in 1976 achieved great popular success.

== Mike Oldfield rendition ==
"Portsmouth"

Single by Mike Oldfield
- B-side: "Argiers"
- Released: 29 October 1976
- Recorded: Througham, January 1976
- Genre: English folk
- Length: 2:04
- Label: Virgin
- Songwriter: Unknown
- Producer: Mike Oldfield

Mike Oldfield singles chronology
"In Dulci Jubilo" (1975)	"Portsmouth" (1976)	"William Tell Overture" (1977)

Popular musician Mike Oldfield recorded an arrangement of the instrumental in 1976. Released as a single, it is Oldfield's highest-charting single in the United Kingdom, where it reached number three.

=== Background ===
In an attempt to repeat the success of his previous year's Christmas hit, "In Dulci Jubilo", Mike recorded another traditional folk melody dating from 1701 (first known publication), again using Leslie Penning on recorders. The single was just as successful as its predecessor, charting at number 3 in the UK, and became his first non-album single to be issued in the USA. It also charted at number 2 in Ireland, and was Oldfield's highest-charting single there until 1983's "Moonlight Shadow", which spent a week at number 1 in Ireland. Mike Oldfield plays acoustic guitar, acoustic bass, accordion, mandolin, ARP string synthesiser, tambourine, kettle drum and bodhran (Irish drum), and both Oldfield and Penning are credited with "feet".

This track, plus two others chosen as the B-side in different countries, had been released the month before as three of four new tracks on the compilation album Boxed. They were mixed and encoded for SQ quadraphonic sound, the only format this album was issued in, and all issues of these tracks in vinyl and tape formats have the encoding, even if they only say "stereo" on the label, as do all single releases.

"Argiers" is another traditional folk tune, performed by Leslie Penning on recorders and Mike Oldfield on acoustic guitar and ARP string synthesiser. An unusual feature of this arrangement is that it is in a minor key, having been converted from its original major key via diatonic transposition. "Portsmouth" and "Argiers" were both recorded in January 1976 at Througham, Gloucestershire, Oldfield's new home studio, shortly after he moved from his previous home in Hergest Ridge, which was the location of his previous home studio, the Beacon.

"Speak (Tho' You Only Say Farewell)" is an old show tune performed by David Bedford on piano and vocals, and Mike Oldfield on vocals. It is similar in style to Bedford's earlier work in the Coxhill-Bedford Duo with Lol Coxhill, and was recorded at the Beacon in November 1974.

The piece is featured on the Mercury Records reissue of Ommadawn, released on 7 June 2010.

=== Track listing ===
- UK 7-inch single (Virgin VS-163):
1. "Portsmouth" (traditional, arr. Oldfield) – 2:02
2. "Speak (Tho' You Only Say Farewell)" (Ray Morello / Horatio Nicholls) – 2:54
- International 7-inch single:
1. "Portsmouth" (traditional, arr. Oldfield) – 2:02
2. "Argiers" (traditional, arr. Oldfield) – 3:59

Issued in USA, Canada, France, Germany, Italy, Spain, the Netherlands, Ireland, Yugoslavia, Australia and South Africa. Each central European country issued it in a cover unique to their country.

Ireland issued both pairings, and some copies of both editions exist mis-pressed with the B-side label belonging to the other edition.

The single has been issued three times in France, in 1976, 1977, and 1980, each with different sleeves.

=== Music video ===
A music video was made for this track, and can be found on the DVD, Elements – The Best of Mike Oldfield. Shot in Oldfield's Througham studio, it shows four female folk dancers who dance barefoot around the studio, while Oldfield is seen playing various instruments. As in the video for his previous single, "In Dulci Jubilo", the video emphasizes that Oldfield plays all the instruments, even though this is not strictly true. (Leslie Penning does not appear in the video)

=== In popular culture ===
The piece was featured in the 1979 NASA documentary film by Tony Palmer, The Space Movie. It also featured during the TV series I'm Alan Partridge.

The piece has become synonymous with English football club, Portsmouth F.C., who play the tune before games at their home stadium, Fratton Park. Notably it was played during their victorious FA Cup 2008 campaign, including after the final game against Cardiff City on 17 May 2008 at Wembley.

In April 2010 two groups were set up on the social networking site Facebook to encourage people to download the single "Portsmouth" via sites such as iTunes in the week commencing 3 May 2010, in a hope to get into the UK Singles Chart, before Portsmouth F.C.'s FA Cup Final appearance against Chelsea. Oldfield himself commented on the campaign. It however did not chart.

=== Charts ===
Chart (1976–77)	Position
Australia (Kent Music Report)	23
UK Singles (OCC)	3

=== Year-end charts ===
Chart (1977)	Position
Australia (Kent Music Report)	73
