= Tubular Bells III Live =

Video by Mike Oldfield
- Released: October 1998
- Recorded: 4 September 1998; Horse Guards Parade
- Genre: Progressive rock
- Length: 60:00
- Label: Warner Music

Mike Oldfield chronology
Elements (1993)	Tubular Bells III Live (1998)	The Art in Heaven Concert (2000)

Tubular Bells II and III DVD cover

Tubular Bells III, The Premiere Performance is a live concert video by Mike Oldfield released in 1998.

It was released on VHS and Laserdisc in 1998, and later packaged with Tubular Bells II Live on DVD, which was certified Gold in UK.

== Concert ==
The video is a full faithful performance from the premiere concert of the Tubular Bells III album at Horse Guards Parade, London, and was released by Warner Music. The concert finishes with encores of "Secrets" and "Far Above the Clouds". "Tubular Bells Part one", "Moonlight Shadow" and "Family Man" were also performed during the encore, but due to these being written by Oldfield when he was with Virgin Records they do not appear on the video.

During the performance of "Man in the Rain" the lights unexpectedly cut out. Oldfield's former Virgin record boss, Richard Branson, was also in the audience.

== Track listing ==
1. "The Source of Secrets"
2. "The Watchful Eye"
3. "Jewel in the Crown"
4. "Outcast"
5. "Serpent Dream"
6. "The Inner Child"
7. "Man in the Rain"
8. "The Top of the Morning"
9. "Moonwatch"
10. "Secrets"
11. "Far Above the Clouds"
12. "Secrets" (Reprise)
13. "Far Above the Clouds" (Reprise)

== Personnel ==
- Mike Oldfield - guitars, keyboards
- Robin Smith – keyboards
- Adrian Thomas – keyboards, engineering
- Hugh Burns – guitar
- Carrie Melbourne – bass, chapman stick
- Katherine Rockhill – piano
- Ian Thomas – drums, electronic percussion
- Jody Linscott – percussion
- Alasdair Malloy – percussion
- Pepsi Demacque – vocals
- Amar – vocals
- Rosa Cedrón – vocals
- Hamish Hamilton – director
- Rachel Holmyard – audio production
