= XXV: The Essential =

Greatest hits album by Mike Oldfield
- Released: 11 November 1997
- Recorded: 1972 – 1997
- Genre: Progressive rock, new-age
- Length: 58:19
- Label: Warner Music UK / Virgin
- Producer: Mike Oldfield and others

Mike Oldfield chronology
Elements Box (1993)	XXV: The Essential (1997)	The Best of Tubular Bells (2001)

XXV: The Essential is a compilation album written and mostly performed by Mike Oldfield and released in 1997. The Roman numerals XXV are to represent that this is a compilation of pieces of the first 25 years of Oldfield's work.

== Background ==
The 14-track album features songs from the first 25 years of Oldfield's career, when he was on the Virgin Records and Warner Music labels.

Oldfield's version of "Women of Ireland" although from his previous album of new material, "Voyager", was released as a single from this compilation album in 1997 and titled "Women of Ireland XXV".

The track "Tubular Bells III" is an early version of the main introduction theme ("Source of Secrets") from Oldfield's then forthcoming album, Tubular Bells III. The differences between this version and the album version are there is a male vocal instead of a female vocal and there is different instrumentation.

== Track listing ==
1. "Tubular Bells" (Excerpt) – 4:16
2. "Hergest Ridge" (Excerpt) – 4:54
3. "Ommadawn" (Excerpt) – 6:57
4. "Incantations" (Excerpt) – 4:38
5. "Moonlight Shadow" – 3:35
6. "Portsmouth" – 2:00
7. "Good News" (from The Killing Fields) – 1:44
8. "Sentinel" (Single remix) (from Tubular Bells II) – 3:56
9. "The Bell" (Remix) – 3:06
10. "Let There Be Light" – 4:19
11. "Only Time Will Tell" – 4:25
12. "The Voyager" – 4:22
13. "Women of Ireland" – 6:27
14. "Tubular Bells III" (Excerpt) – 3:40

== Charts ==
=== Weekly charts ===
Chart (1998)	Peak position
Hungarian Albums (MAHASZ)	30

== Certifications ==
Region	Certification	Certified units/sales
Poland (ZPAV)	Gold	50,000^{*}
Spain (PROMUSICAE)	Gold	50,000^{^}
^{*} Sales figures based on certification alone.^{^} Shipments figures based on certification alone.
