= The Art in Heaven Concert =

Video by Mike Oldfield
- Released: 10 February 2000
- Recorded: 31 December 1999; Berlin, Germany
- Genre: Progressive rock
- Length: 80 mins
- Label: Warner Music

Mike Oldfield chronology
Tubular Bells III Live (1998)	The Art in Heaven Concert (2000)

The Art in Heaven Concert (full title Mike Oldfield The Art in Heaven Concert Live in Berlin) is a Mike Oldfield concert video taken from 2000 New Year's night (31 December 1999) concert at the Victory Column in Berlin, Germany, which is currently available on both CD and DVD.

== Performance ==
At the concert, Oldfield performed pieces from his back catalogue, his then latest album The Millennium Bell and another piece titled "Art in Heaven". "Art in Heaven" begins with an excerpt from the first track of his The Songs of Distant Earth album ("In the Beginning"), and ends with "Ode to Joy" from Ludwig van Beethoven's Ninth Symphony. The rest of the piece was specially composed for the event and was later turned into "Thou Art in Heaven" on his next album Tres Lunas.

The concert was a few months after the Live Then & Now 1999 tour and Oldfield's last performance until 2006.

== DVD track listing ==
=== Classic songs ===
1. "Tubular Bells" (Excerpts from part 1)
2. "Portsmouth"
3. "Moonlight Shadow"
4. "Secrets"
5. "Shadow on the Wall"

=== The Millennium Bell songs ===
6. "Sunlight" ("Sunlight Shining Through Cloud")
7. "The Doges Palace"
8. "Mastermind"
9. "Broad" ("Broad Sunlit Uplands")
10. "Liberation"
11. "Amber Light"
12. "The Millennium Bell"

=== Special features ===
- "Art in Heaven" – Oldfield's 13-minute solo
- "The Making Of..." – documentary
- Interview with Mike Oldfield

== Personnel ==
- Mike Oldfield – guitars, keyboards
- Robin Smith – conductor
- Adrian Thomas – keyboards, guitars
- Claire Nicolson – keyboards, guitar
- Carrie Melbourne – bass, Chapman Stick
- Fergus Gerrand – drums, percussion
- Jody Linscott – percussion
- Pepsi Demacque – vocals
- Miriam Stockley – vocals
- Nicola Emmanuelle – vocals
- David Serame – vocals

Also

- Symphony Orchestra State Academic Capella, Saint Petersburg
- The Glinka State Choir, Saint Petersburg

Production

- Gert Hof – director
- Egon Banghard – producer
- Achim Perleberg – producer

== Sight & Sound version ==
On 30 June 2008 Warner re-released the concert in a CD and DVD double pack as a part of their Sight & Sound, Classic Performance Live range. The DVD is the same as the original release, with the CD being a reordered version of the concert, excluding the "Art in Heaven" 13 minute track.

=== CD track listing ===
1. "Tubular Bells"
2. "Portsmouth"
3. "Moonlight Shadow"
4. "Secrets"
5. "Shadow on the Wall"
6. "Sunlight"
7. "The Doges Palace"
8. "Mastermind"
9. "Broad"
10. "Liberation"
11. "Amber Light"
12. "The Millennium Bell"
