= Man in the Rain =

Single by Mike Oldfield

from the album Tubular Bells III
- Released: 5 October 1998
- Genre: Pop rock
- Length: 4:01
- Label: Warner
- Songwriter: Mike Oldfield
- Producer: Mike Oldfield

Mike Oldfield singles chronology
"Tubular X" (1998)	"Man in the Rain" (1998)	"Far Above the Clouds" (1999)

"Man in the Rain" is a pop rock song written and performed by English multi-instrumentalist Mike Oldfield. It was included on the album Tubular Bells III and released as a single on 5 October 1998 by Warner Music. The vocals were performed by Irish folk singer Cara Dillon.

== History ==
"Man in the Rain" is similar in style to Oldfield's 1983 hit, "Moonlight Shadow", from which "Man in the Rain" borrows sampled drums. An early version of "Man in the Rain" was also written shortly after "Moonlight Shadow".

Another early demo version of "Man in the Rain" was recorded for Oldfield's Islands album, with vocals by Barry Palmer; this version later turned into the song "Heaven's Open". "Man in the Rain" was also the working title for the album Heaven's Open.

Although Cara Dillon performs on the album, she was not present at the Tubular Bells III première concert at Horse Guards Parade in London. For this performance and subsequent live dates, she was replaced by Pepsi DeMacque. During the premiere performance of "Man in the Rain" some of the stage lights unexpectedly cut out.

One of the B-sides, "The Inner Child", featured Luar na Lubre vocalist Rosa Cedrón.

== Track listing ==
All songs by Mike Oldfield.

1. "Man in the Rain" – 4:01
2. "Serpent Dream" (live at Horse Guards Parade 04/09/98) – 3:00
3. "The Inner Child" (live at Horse Guards Parade 04/09/98) – 4:43

== Charts ==
Chart (1998)	Position
Germany (GfK)	94

UK: 98
