= Shirlie Holliman =

English singer (born 1962)

Shirlie Kemp
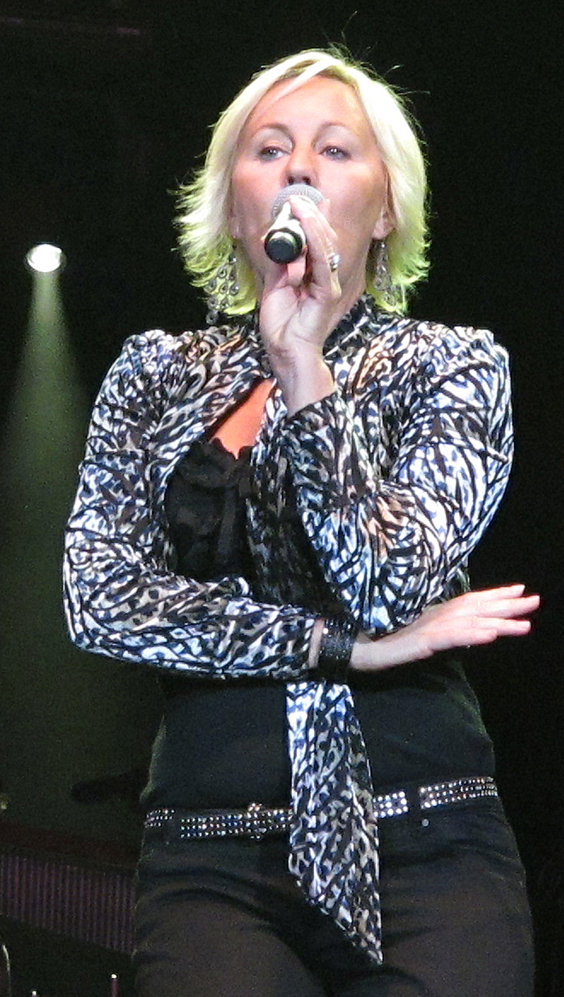
- Kemp performing at the Liverpool Echo Arena in June 2011
- Born: 18 April 1962 (age 64); Bushey Heath, Hertfordshire, England
- Spouse: Martin Kemp (m. 1988)
- Children: Roman Kemp (son); Harley-Moon Kemp (daughter)
- Musical career
- Genres: Pop
- Occupation: Singer
- Years active: 1981–1991; 2000; 2011–present
- Labels: Innervison; Epic; Columbia
- Formerly of: Pepsi & Shirlie

Shirlie Kemp (née Holliman; born 18 April 1962) is an English singer who found fame in the 1980s with Wham! and as part of the duo Pepsi & Shirlie along with Helen DeMacque.

== Early years ==
Shirley Holliman was the fourth child of five, born to Arthur and Margaret Holliman and raised on a council estate in Bushey, near Watford, Hertfordshire. Holliman intended to train as a horse riding instructor, but after she developed hay fever at the age of 18 and with nothing else to do, her then-boyfriend Andrew Ridgeley suggested she come and dance while he and his friend George Michael's band played a local gig.

== Music career ==
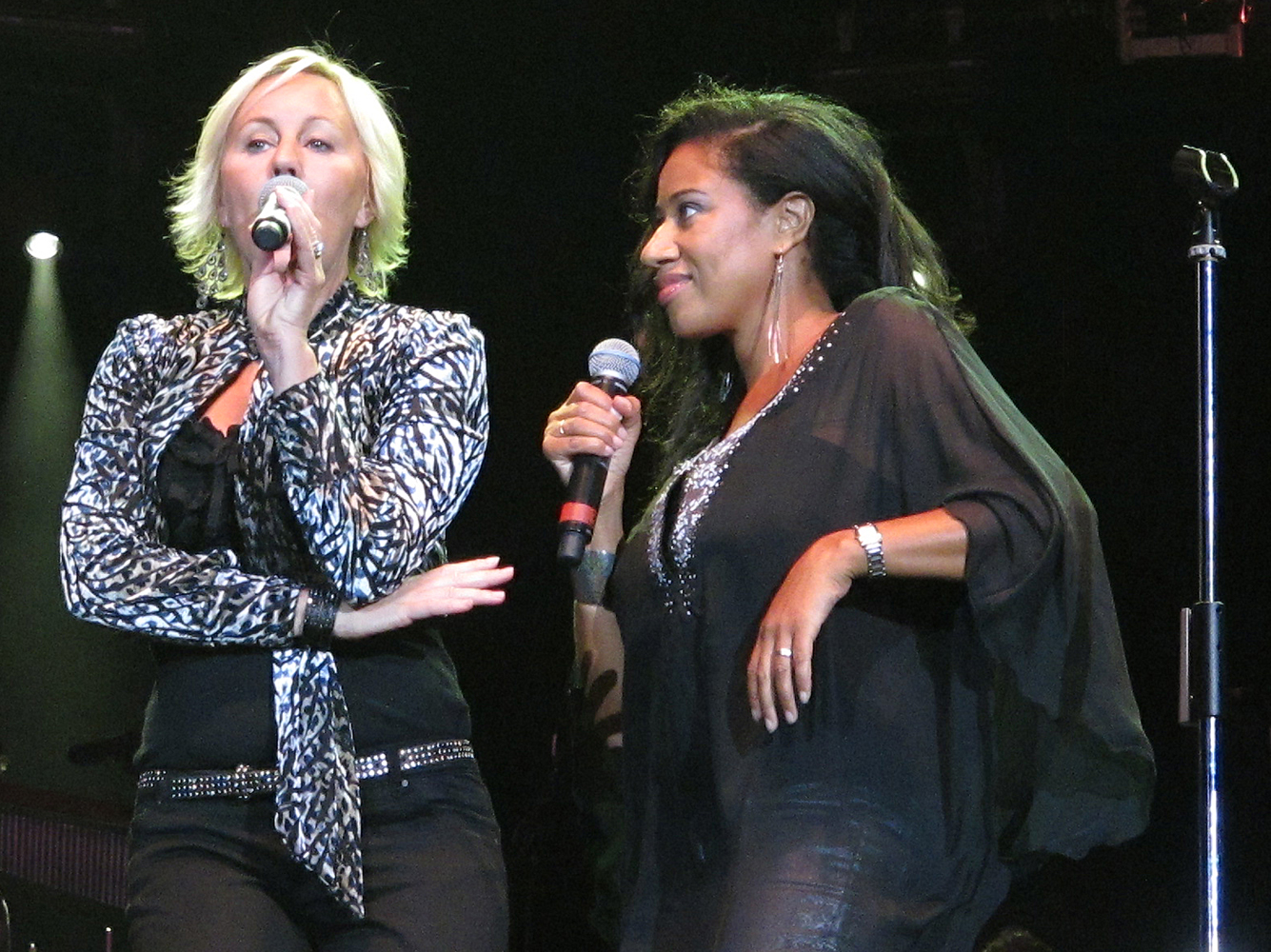
Pepsi and Shirlie at the Liverpool Echo Arena, 2011

Holliman was never a band member of what became Wham! but, like her friend Dee C. Lee, was paid on a per performance basis as a backing singer, and continued to live with her parents. After Lee left to join the Style Council (she later married that group's lead singer Paul Weller) she was replaced by Helen "Pepsi" DeMacque, and this duo performed on all the Wham! songs and concerts. As George Michael desired to create music targeted to a more sophisticated audience than Wham!'s primarily teenage fan base, the announcement of Wham!'s break-up was made in the spring of 1986, with a grand finale concert at Wembley Stadium on 28 June 1986, called the Final.

During their Wham! career, Holliman and DeMacque decided to form their own act, named Pepsi & Shirlie. Created immediately after the Wembley concert with the aim of having an upbeat and more purely pop sound, they had two UK top 10 hits: "Heartache", which was produced by Phil Fearon and Tambi Fernando and reached No. 2 on the UK Singles Chart (behind the No. 1 hit of George Michael and Aretha Franklin's "I Knew You Were Waiting (For Me)"), and "Goodbye Stranger", produced by Tambi Fernando and Pete Hammond, which reached No. 9 – both of these being from the album All Right Now.

Pepsi & Shirlie went on hiatus in 1989, briefly returning twice: once in 1991 with an album, Change, which was widely ignored, then again in 2000 to record backing vocals on the UK number one Geri Halliwell hit "Bag It Up". The duo also reunited to perform for the 'Here and Now 10th Anniversary tour' which began on 24 June 2011.

On 29 November 2002, Holliman was a back-up vocalist in the Concert for George, a concert celebrating the music of the late George Harrison.

In November 2019, Holliman and her husband Martin Kemp released their first album together as Martin & Shirlie, titled In the Swing of It via Sony Music. The album contains duet covers of classic jazz standards plus two original songs written by their daughter Harley Moon Kemp.

In January 2023, Holliman appeared alongside her husband on the fourth series of The Masked Singer as "Cat & Mouse".

== Personal life ==
Holliman was in a relationship with Andrew Ridgeley, whom she described as very charismatic, for two years. Following their break up, George Michael encouraged her to telephone Spandau Ballet bassist and singer Martin Kemp, who had given her his number. Holliman and Kemp married in St. Lucia in 1988 and went on to have two children: daughter Harley Moon Kemp (born August 1989) and son Roman Kemp (born January 1993). She retired from steady performing after the birth of their daughter, though Holliman and daughter Harley had brief roles together in the music video for the Spice Girls' "Mama".

After Holliman took time out from work to care for her husband through his illness with brain tumours, she was declared bankrupt in September 1996, and the family moved from Hampstead Heath to Muswell Hill to allow Kemp to recover. Holliman then went to work managing Aegean, a business associated with music and entertainment production.

In October 2020, Holliman with her husband published Shirlie and Martin Kemp: It's a Love Story, an autobiography-cum-relationship advice book. The Kemps said the book was published in response to "growing media interest" in the couple's long-lasting relationship.

In 2021, Holliman appeared with her son in the documentary Roman Kemp: Our Silent Emergency in which Kemp revealed that he came close to attempting suicide after battling with depression for 13 years.

As Shirlie Kemp, she gave a personal account of the wild times touring with Wham! in the joint autobiography, Pepsi & Shirlie: It's All Black and White, written with her friend, Pepsi DeMacque-Crockett, and published by Welbeck in 2021.

== Bibliography ==
- Kemp, Shirley; Kemp, Martin (2020). Shirlie and Martin Kemp: It's a Love Story. London: Mirror Books. ISBN 978-1913406363.
