= Tubular Bells II Live =

Video by Mike Oldfield
- Released: October 1992; 20 September 1999 (DVD)
- Recorded: 4 September 1992; Edinburgh Castle
- Genre: Progressive rock, new-age
- Length: 65:00
- Label: Warner Music
- Producer: Jeff Griffin (audio); John Archer (video); Mike Newman (director)

Mike Oldfield chronology
The Wind Chimes (1988)	Tubular Bells II Live (1992)	Elements (1993)

Tubular Bells II and III DVD cover

Tubular Bells II, The Performance Live at Edinburgh Castle is a live concert video by Mike Oldfield released in 1992.

== Background ==
The video is a full faithful performance from the premiere concert of the Tubular Bells II album at Edinburgh Castle. The tour continued until the following October. John Gordon Sinclair performed the part of the Master of Ceremonies at the concert; on the album Alan Rickman was the Master of Ceremonies. The concert finishes with a reprise of "The Bell". Eight thousand people were at the concert in Edinburgh, Scotland.

It was released on VHS and Laserdisc in 1992, and later packaged with Tubular Bells III Live on DVD.

== Track listing ==
1. "Sentinel"
2. "Dark Star"
3. "Clear Light"
4. "Blue Saloon"
5. "Sunjammer"
6. "Red Dawn"
7. "The Bell"
8. "Weightless"
9. "The Great Plain"
10. "Sunset Door"
11. "Tattoo"
12. "Altered State"
13. "Maya Gold"
14. "Moonshine"
15. "Reprise"

== Personnel ==
- Mike Oldfield - Acoustic guitar, Classical guitar, Electric guitar, Banjo, Keyboards, Vocals, Tubular bells
- Robin A Smith – Conductor
- David Bedford – Orchestration
- Jay Stapley – Guitar
- Hugh Burns – Guitar
- Alan Limbrick – Guitar
- Craig Pruess – Keyboards
- Richard Cottle – Keyboards
- Dave Hartley – Keyboards
- Adrian Thomas – Programmer
- Yitkin Seow – Piano
- Lawrence Cottle – Bass guitar
- Ian Thomas – Drums
- Ben Hoffnung – Percussion
- Alasdair Malloy – Percussion
- Gerry McKenna – Banjo
- Pete Clarke – Fiddle
- John Parricelli – Mandolin & Guitar
- Jackie Quinn – Vocals
- Linda Taylor – Vocals
- Edie Lehmann – Vocals
- Susannah Melvoin – Vocals
- John Gordon Sinclair – MC
