= Voyager (Mike Oldfield album) =

Studio album by Mike Oldfield
- Released: 26 August 1996
- Recorded: Roughwood Studio, Buckinghamshire; Air studios (Orchestra)
- Genres: Celtic, new-age
- Length: 58:25
- Labels: Warner Music UK/WEA; Reprise (in the US)
- Producer: Mike Oldfield

Mike Oldfield chronology
The Songs of Distant Earth (1994)	Voyager (1996)	Tubular Bells III (1998)

Singles from Voyager
- 1. "Women of Ireland" Released: 10 November 1997

Professional ratings
Review scores
Source	Rating
AllMusic	2/5 stars

Voyager is the seventeenth studio album by Mike Oldfield, released in 1996 by Warner Music UK. It is a Celtic-themed album with new pieces intertwined with covers of 20th century compositions and older traditional pieces.

== Background ==
The album was the last in the original three-album deal which Oldfield had signed with Warner after leaving Virgin, starting with Tubular Bells II. Oldfield would stay with Warner until 2003, where his final album for the label was Tubular Bells 2003.

In an interview from the time, Oldfield claimed that the album was one of his quickest to create, only taking a month and a half to record, also claiming that he composed and recorded some songs in one morning.

=== Celtic music ===
The music on this album is the most overtly Celtic music Mike Oldfield has produced. The album was originally recorded using only acoustic hand-played instruments. After the daughter of a Warner Music exec said it sounded boring, Oldfield added synthesizers and more instruments to the album.

"The Song of the Sun" is song composed by Bieito Romero of the Galician Celtic band Luar na Lubre whose original title is "O son do ar" ("The sound of the air")."The Hero" is a Scottish piece originally written by James Scott Skinner in 1903, as "Hector the Hero". "She Moves Through the Fair" is a traditional Irish song, the melody of which had been used by Simple Minds for "Belfast Child" in 1989. "Women of Ireland", although credited as a traditional song, is not: the main theme is a melody written by Irish composer Seán Ó Riada as a musical setting of the poem "Mná na hÉireann", written by Peadar Ó Doirnín; Oldfield's rendition also includes an interpolation of the fourth movement (Sarabande) of George Frideric Handel's Keyboard suite in D minor, popularised by its use by Stanley Kubrick in his 1975 film Barry Lyndon, where Ó Riada's tune also appears (Oldfield's "Women of Ireland" was reportedly inspired by the coupling of both pieces in the film). "Dark Island" is a Scottish instrumental and song; the original music was written by Iain Maclachlan as Dr. Mackay's Farewell to Creagorry in 1958. Later used as the theme to a 1962 BBC TV series and re-titled for the series. A set of words were later written by David Silver in 1963. Another well known set of words were also set to a variation of the tune in 1963, by Stewart Ross. "Flowers of the Forest" is a traditional Scottish song, a lament for the defeat at Flodden in 1513.

"Mont Saint-Michel", a piece on the album composed by Oldfield, refers to a tidal island in France.

== Singles ==
The German promo single for "The Voyager"

Promotional singles for "The Voyager" and "The Song of the Sun", in Germany and Spain respectively, were released in 1996. Mike Oldfield's rendition of "Women of Ireland" was released as a single in 1997.

== Other artists' samples ==
The song "Celtic Rain" was sampled in 2008 by Snoop Dogg, in the song "Why Did You Leave Me" of the album Ego Trippin'. The song was produced by Polow da Don.

== Track listing ==
1. "The Song of the Sun" (Bieito Romero) – 4:32
2. "Celtic Rain" (Mike Oldfield) – 4:41
3. "The Hero" (James Scott Skinner; arranged by Oldfield) – 5:03
4. "Women of Ireland" (Seán Ó Riada; arranged by Oldfield) – 6:29
5. "The Voyager" (Oldfield) – 4:26
6. "She Moves Through the Fair" (Traditional; arranged by Oldfield) – 4:06
7. "Dark Island" (Iain Maclachlan; arranged by Oldfield) – 5:43
8. "Wild Goose Flaps Its Wings" (Oldfield) – 5:04
9. "Flowers of the Forest" (Traditional; arranged by Oldfield) – 6:03
10. "Mont St Michel" (Oldfield) – 12:18

== Personnel ==
- Mike Oldfield – guitar
- Máire Breatnach – fiddle
- London Voices – choir vocals
- Noel Eccles – percussion
- Liam O'Flynn – Uilleann pipes
- Chris Apps, Roger Huth, Ian Macey, Bob MacIntosh – Highland pipers
- Seán Keane – fiddle
- London Symphony Orchestra
- Matt Molloy – flutes, tin whistles
- John Myers – tin whistle, fiddle
- Davy Spillane – Uilleann pipes, low whistle
- Pat Walsh – additional music
- Robin Smith – musical arrangement (track 10), music conductor (10)
- Henry Jackman – additional music programming

Technical

- Gregg Jackman – assistant engineer
- Tom Newman – assistant engineer
- Richard Barrie – technical engineer

== Charts ==
Chart (1996)	Peak position
Austrian Albums (Ö3 Austria)	16
Belgian Albums (Ultratop Wallonia)	26
Danish Albums (Hitlisten)	16
Dutch Albums (Album Top 100)	41
Finnish Albums (Suomen virallinen lista)	21
French Albums (SNEP)	40
German Albums (Offizielle Top 100)	15
Hungarian Albums (MAHASZ)	1
Norwegian Albums (VG-lista)	30
Spanish Albums (PROMUSICAE)	1
Scottish Albums (Official Charts)	18
Swedish Albums (Sverigetopplistan)	13
Swiss Albums (Schweizer Hitparade)	15
UK Albums (Official Charts)	12

== Certifications and sales ==
Certifications and sales for Voyager
Region	Certification	Certified units/sales
Poland (ZPAV)	Gold	20,000^{*}
Spain (Promusicae)	3× Platinum	300,000^{^}
United Kingdom (BPI)	Gold	100,000^{^}
Summaries
Worldwide	—	600,000
^{*} Sales figures based on certification alone.^{^} Shipments figures based on certification alone.
