= The Millennium Bell =

Studio album by Mike Oldfield
- Released: 26 November 1999
- Recorded: Roughwood Studios, Abbey Road Studios, London; 1999
- Genres: Progressive rock, new-age, world music
- Length: 45:03
- Label: Warner
- Producer: Mike Oldfield

Mike Oldfield chronology
Guitars (1999)	The Millennium Bell (1999)	Tres Lunas (2002)

Tubular Bells series chronology
Tubular Bells III (1998)	The Millennium Bell (1999)	The Best of Tubular Bells (2001)

Professional ratings
Review scores
Source	Rating
AllMusic	2.5/5 stars

The Millennium Bell is the twentieth studio album by English musician Mike Oldfield, released in 1999. The theme of the album is a reflection of different periods of human history. The album borrows its name from the dawning of the 3rd millennium and from its title referring to Oldfield's Tubular Bells series. It is the most recent entry in the Tubular Bells series to feature all-new material. It was the main work performed at Oldfield's concert for Berlin's new year celebrations on 31 December 1999.

== Recording, release and Millennium concert ==
Oldfield recorded the majority of the album at his home studio, Roughwood Studios, Berkshire, and then recorded the orchestrations in just one day at Abbey Road Studios, London with the London Session Orchestra.

It was Oldfield's third album within one year, after Tubular Bells III in late 1998 and Guitars earlier in 1999. It was the third Mike Oldfield album available on the MiniDisc format, after Tubular Bells and Tubular Bells II were both released on MiniDisc in 1992.

A free live performance of the latter half of the album plus some older tracks was given in Berlin, Germany on New Year's Eve 1999, with an estimated audience of 500,000 people. This concert was released on a DVD (and later CD) with the title The Art in Heaven Concert.

== Album analysis ==
The main theme of The Millennium Bell is the view on the two thousand years after the birth of Jesus of Nazareth through a series of single episodes describing important moments in history, as well as different aspects of humanity. The album is eclectic in style, ranging from majestic choruses and soundtrack-esque orchestral passages through New Age sonic textures and ethnic sounds to the strong pulse of electronic percussion.

=== "Peace on Earth" ===
The opening track, "Peace on Earth", is essentially a Christmas carol, referring to the newborn Jesus Christ, the bringer of peace on Earth. The main aspect of this track is hope.

=== "Pacha Mama" ===
Mixing electronic and ethnic sounds, namely the ethnic percussion, "Pacha Mama" was based on the music of Incas – Mike Oldfield paid a visit to Peru – and, in a broader sense, refers to Native Americans (both in North and South America) in pre-Columbian era, before another important year in human history – the year 1492.

=== "Santa Maria" ===
"Santa Maria" – taking its name from Christopher Columbus' flagship, Santa Maria – is about the age of exploration; it depicts the discovery of America by the Europeans. The most important part of this track is the quasi-sacral choir vocal, reminding us of the religious background behind the journey.

=== "Sunlight Shining Through Cloud" ===
The verse from "Sunlight Shining Through Cloud" is taken from Amazing Grace, written by Anglican clergyman John Newton, who for some time was a captain of the slave ship The Duke of Argyle and later became a strong advocate for the abolition of the slave trade. The track, featuring strong African themes, refers to slave trade. Mike Oldfield visited Goree Island, an island on the Senegalese coast famed for its slave trading port, now converted to a shrine. The track also features strong gospel influences – a hint at the descendants of the African slaves in North America and the culture and music they would establish in the future. The main aspect of the track is humans' ability to exploit one another.

=== "The Doge's Palace" ===
Driven by the electronic percussion's relentless pulse combined with male operatic vocals, strings and solo oboe, "The Doge's Palace" makes a leap to Europe, to the Venetian Republic, a powerful trade power. The track, vaguely reminiscent of the contemporary Baroque compositions written by Gian Piero Reverberi for his Rondò Veneziano chamber orchestra, refers to four Venetian doges by name – Pietro Polani, Enrico Dandolo, Francesco Donato and Giovanni Delfino. "The Doge's Palace" refers to Europe in the middle of the second millennium, where unions of cities, regions and/or countries, organised mostly for commercial reasons (for example Hansa), played an important part in establishing various forms of social organisation, and which paved the way to the emergence of modern countries and relations between them.

=== "Lake Constance" ===
"Lake Constance", the first fully orchestral track on the album, refers to the age of Romanticism in Europe, a movement which evoked spontaneous emotions and feelings, making them the main source of humans' perceiving of the world, instead of rationalism. Musically referring to the music of the Romantic period, namely the works of Berlioz, it refers to Lake Constance on the Swiss-German border, reminding us that the sheer beauty of nature was a great inspiration for Romantic artists. The track refers to human ability to create art.

=== "Mastermind" ===
"Mastermind" leaps forward to the 1920s, the time of prohibition in the US and the rise of modern organised crime. Its dark, synthetic, underground mood was based on the gangster movies from the 1930s and 1940s.

=== "Broad Sunlit Uplands" ===
Another fully orchestral piece, "Broad Sunlit Uplands" takes its name from one of Winston Churchill's famous speeches, and refers to the beginning of World War II. To experience what Churchill felt during the days of Operation Sea Lion, Mike Oldfield visited his war room, Blenheim Palace. The track refers to the grimy phenomenon of war.

=== "Liberation" ===
The spoken word on "Liberation" is an excerpt from The Diary of Anne Frank, spoken by Mike Oldfield's daughter, Greta, who at the time of recording was roughly the same age as Anne Frank at the time of writing her diary. The track refers to the end of World War II.

=== "Amber Light" ===
"Amber Light", with some words in Xhosa, translating to "There is light at the end of the tunnel", refers to the end of apartheid in South Africa and also the turn of the 3rd millennium – a look into a new, unknown, but hopeful future.

=== "The Millennium Bell" ===
The album concludes with the title track, musically referring to all the other tracks in the album as well as the Cossack traditional dance, being some sort of resume of the two thousand years as well as a look into the future. The track has a strong electronica/disco feeling as it was co-arranged by an Ibiza performer (where Oldfield lived for some time), DJ Pippi.

== Track listing ==
1. "Peace on Earth" – 4:10
2. "Pacha Mama" – 4:05
3. "Santa Maria" – 2:44
4. "Sunlight Shining Through Cloud" – 4:33
5. "The Doge's Palace" – 3:07
6. "Lake Constance" – 5:16
7. "Mastermind" – 3:03
8. "Broad Sunlit Uplands" – 4:03
9. "Liberation" – 2:38
10. "Amber Light" – 3:42
11. "The Millennium Bell" – 7:37

== Personnel ==
- Mike Oldfield – Producer, performer and writer
- Ben Darlow – Engineer
- Robyn Smith – Conductor, Arranger
- The London Session Orchestra
- The London Händel Choir
- The Grant Gospel Choir
- Nicola Emmanuelle – Vocals
- David Serame – Vocals
- Miriam Stockley – Vocals
- Camilla Darlow – Vocals
- Andrew Johnson – Vocals
- Gota Yashiki – Drums
- Martay – Vocals
- Pepsi Demacque – Vocals
- Greta Hegerland-Oldfield – Narration
- DJ Pippi – Arrangement

== Charts ==
Chart (1999)	Position
Austria	43
Germany	39
Hungarian Albums (MAHASZ)	16
Spanish Albums (PROMUSICAE)	5
Switzerland	94

== Certifications and sales ==
Region	Certification	Certified units/sales
Spain (Promusicae)	Platinum	100,000^{^}
^{^} Shipments figures based on certification alone.
