= Tubular Bells III =

Studio album by Mike Oldfield
- Released: 31 August 1998
- Recorded: December 1996–June 1998
- Studios: Oldfield's home studio in Es Cubells, Ibiza and London
- Genres: New-age, progressive rock, electronic, chill out
- Length: 46:36
- Label: Warner Music UK
- Producer: Mike Oldfield

Mike Oldfield chronology
Voyager (1996)	Tubular Bells III (1998)	Guitars (1999)

Tubular Bells series chronology
Tubular Bells II (1992)	Tubular Bells III (1998)	The Millennium Bell (1999)

Singles from Tubular Bells III
- 1. "Man in the Rain" Released: 5 October 1998; 2. "Far Above the Clouds" Released: 12 April 1999

Tubular Bells III is the eighteenth studio album by English guitarist, songwriter, and producer Mike Oldfield. It was released on 31 August 1998 by Warner Music UK as the third instalment in his Tubular Bells album series. After relocating from England to the Spanish island of Ibiza in 1996, Oldfield started work on the album and gained inspiration to incorporate electronic music from the island's local bars and clubs.

== Background ==
By mid-1996, Oldfield had put his Buckinghamshire home for sale and relocated to the Spanish island of Ibiza, setting up a recording studio at Casa Atlantis, a cliffside home in Es Cubells which he designed on a virtual reality simulator on his computer and had it built from scratch. With Ibiza being a major club destination, he became inspired by the electronic and dance music that local DJs were playing and decided to make a dance version of the familiar opening to "Tubular Bells (Part One)", which he used with a Nord Lead synthesizer and used the "caveman" beat from "Tubular Bells (Part Two)". Oldfield liked the results, which persuaded him to make a third Tubular Bells album, following Tubular Bells (1973) and Tubular Bells II (1992). Despite not having a recording contract at the time, Oldfield secured a new deal with Warner Music UK by informing the label that he wished to start work on a third Tubular Bells album.

Oldfield later admitted that Ibiza's hedonistic lifestyle was a negative influence on him and succumbed to alcohol and drugs. In one incident, he was caught driving while twice over the legal alcohol limit and received a one-year driving ban. In April 1998, Oldfield left Ibiza and returned to live at Roughwood Croft, his home in Chalfont St. Giles, Buckinghamshire, which he had bought in the late 1980s. He then continued recording Tubular Bells III in London until June 1998. In August, he put his Ibiza home, two cars, and powerboat for sale for £2 million. The home was bought by Noel Gallagher.

== Music ==
Unlike Tubular Bells II, Tubular Bells III does not follow the pattern of the two pieces from the original album, but instead references Tubular Bells musically. For example, "The Source of Secrets" takes up music from the "Introduction" section of the original album, while "Far Above the Clouds" references the "Finale" section of "Tubular Bells (Part One)".

An early version of "The Source of Secrets" appears on Oldfield's compilation album XXV: The Essential (1997).

"Man in the Rain" is a pop song with lead vocals by Irish folk singer Cara Dillon and additional vocal takes by Heather Burnett. In the liner notes, Dillon is credited as "Cara from Polar Star", which references the short-lived name for a musical project she was involved in at the time. Oldfield wrote the song about ten years prior to recording and wrote the lyrics, which were influenced by his separation from his third wife. The drums on the song are sampled from Oldfield's 1983 song "Moonlight Shadow" from Crises (1983), originally performed by drummer Simon Phillips.

The tracks "The Source of Secrets", "Jewel in the Crown", and "Secrets" feature Amar as a vocalist. Oldfield can be heard on "Outcast". "The Inner Child" features Luar Na Lubre vocalist Rosa Cedrón. The live version of "Man in the Rain" was mostly sung by Helen Pepsi DeMacque, notably at the London Premiere of Tubular Bells III (1998). "Far Above the Clouds" features Clodagh Simonds performing the main vocals while the child's vocals are performed by Francesca Robertson.

Some of the instruments which appear on the album are a Roland D-550, JD-990, JV1080, Clavia Nord Lead, and Korg Trinity synthesisers. The Roland VG8 Guitar synthesiser is used on tracks such as "Man in the Rain".

Oldfield also used sampled drums from his Crises and Ommadawn album on certain tracks. "Man in the Rain" features sampled drums from "Moonlight Shadow", "Outcast" features sampled drums from "Shadow on the Wall" and "Far Above the Clouds" features sampled drums from the end of "Ommadawn part 1". "Far Above the Clouds" also features a sampled guitar rhythm from the "Finale" section of "Tubular Bells (Part 1)", though in this instance it is fairly low in the mix and at a much faster tempo.

== Artwork ==
The album artwork is Oldfield's trademark bent tubular bell shape in silver, based upon the original 1973 Tubular Bells album cover, set upon a grey background. The artwork itself does not contain any text and typically a sticker with Oldfield's name and the album title are placed on the outer packaging.

== Reception ==
Professional ratings
Review scores
Source	Rating
AllMusic	3/5 stars
Q	4/5 stars

Tubular Bells III is the least successful of the three main Tubular Bells albums, only attaining No. 4 on the UK chart, unlike its two chart topping predecessors. Critical reaction was mixed. The very distinct similarity of "Man in the Rain" to the hit "Moonlight Shadow" was sometimes interpreted by listeners as Oldfield trying to retread old ground.

== Live performance ==
On 4 September 1998, six years to the day after the premiere of Tubular Bells II at Edinburgh Castle, Oldfield held a premiere concert for Tubular Bells III at Horse Guards Parade in London in front of around 7,000 people. Much of the performance was held during torrential rain. The live version of the complete album from the premiere concert is available on the double DVD Tubular Bells II/Tubular Bells III.

The Live Then & Now 1999 tour was in promotion of this album and his following album, Guitars.

On 27 July 2012 at the 2012 Summer Olympics opening ceremony Mike Oldfield performed renditions of Tubular Bells, "Far Above the Clouds" and "In Dulci Jubilo" during a segment about the NHS. This track was later released on the Isles of Wonder album and as a limited edition blue/pink vinyl single.

== Reissues ==
Tubular Bells III, along with Tubular Bells II and The Songs of Distant Earth, was reissued on 180g vinyl on 27 April 2015. This follows the recent releases of Tubular Bells, Hergest Ridge, QE2, Five Miles Out and Crises on the same format.

== Track listing ==
All tracks by Mike Oldfield.

1. "The Source of Secrets" – 5:35
2. "The Watchful Eye" – 2:09
3. "Jewel in the Crown" – 5:45
4. "Outcast" – 3:49
5. "Serpent Dream" – 2:53
6. "The Inner Child" – 4:41
7. "Man in the Rain" – 4:03
8. "The Top of the Morning" – 4:26
9. "Moonwatch" – 4:25
10. "Secrets" – 3:20
11. "Far Above the Clouds" – 5:30

== Charts ==
Chart performance for Tubular Bells III
Chart (1998)	Peak position
Australian Albums (ARIA)	98
Austrian Albums (Ö3 Austria)	4
Dutch Albums (Album Top 100)	46
French Albums (SNEP)	47
German Albums (Offizielle Top 100)	9
Hungarian Albums (MAHASZ)	3
Spanish Albums (PROMUSICAE)	1
Swedish Albums (Sverigetopplistan)	31
Swiss Albums (Schweizer Hitparade)	26
UK Albums (Official Charts)	4

== Certifications and sales ==
Certifications for Tubular Bells III
Region	Certification	Certified units/sales
Spain (Promusicae)	4× Platinum	400,000^{^}
United Kingdom (BPI)	Gold	100,000^{^}
^{^} Shipments figures based on certification alone.

== Personnel ==
Music

- Mike Oldfield – all instruments
- Amar – vocals on "The Source of Secrets", "Jewels in the Crown", and "Secrets"
- Rosa Cedrón – vocals on "The Inner Child"
- Cara Dillon – vocals on "Man in the Rain"
- Heather Burnett – additional vocals on "Man in the Rain"
- Clodagh Simonds – vocals on "Far Above the Clouds"
- Francesca Robertson – child vocals on "Far Above the Clouds"

Production

- Mike Oldfield – producer, engineer
- BSS20 – album design
- Model Solutions – tubular bells construction
- Silvia Müller – assistant engineer
- Andy Earl – photography
- Simon Fowler – portrait photography
- Rob Dickins – executive producer
