= Gimme Back =

Single by Michael Oldfield

from the album Heaven's Open
- Released: June 1991
- Recorded: 1990
- Genre: Progressive rock
- Length: 4:12
- Label: Virgin Records
- Songwriter: Michael Oldfield
- Producer: Thom Newman

Michael Oldfield singles chronology
"Heaven's Open" (1991)	"Gimme Back" (1991)	"Sentinel" (1992)

"Gimme Back" is a single by musician Michael Oldfield. It is from the album Heaven's Open. It was only released in Germany in 1991. Oldfield performs vocals himself.

== Track listing ==
1. "Gimme Back" – 4:12
2. "Amarok" (excerpt II) – 3:22
3. "Amarok" (excerpt III) – 9:30
