= Heaven's Open =

1991 album by Michael Oldfield

Studio album by Michael Oldfield
- Released: 18 February 1991
- Recorded: Late 1990
- Genre: Rock, pop rock, progressive rock
- Length: 43:13
- Label: Virgin
- Producer: Thom Newman

Mike Oldfield chronology
Amarok (1990)	Heaven's Open (1991)	Tubular Bells II (1992)

Singles from Heaven's Open
- 1. "Heaven's Open" Released: January 1991; 2. "Gimme Back" Released: June 1991 (Ger.)

Professional ratings
Review scores
Source	Rating
Allmusic	3/5 stars

Heaven's Open is the fourteenth studio album by Mike Oldfield, released in 1991. It was his last album on Virgin, and also the only album he released under the name Michael Oldfield, instead of Mike Oldfield. The producer of the album, Tom Newman's name is also spelled out in a similar manner, as Thom Newman. The album is essentially a concept album, lyrics dealing with a forthcoming liberation from artist's recording contract.

== History ==
By 1991 and the release of Heaven's Open, Oldfield was happy to leave Virgin Records. The final goodbye to Virgin appears at the very end of "Music from the Balcony", where a quiet laughter and Oldfield's voice saying "Fuck off!" can be heard.

Heaven's Open is Oldfield's only album where he performs all the lead vocals himself, due to his having come to terms with the sound of his own voice.

After leaving Virgin, Oldfield released the anticipated Tubular Bells II in 1992 with Warner Brothers.

=== Connections to other Oldfield albums ===
The album's cover is a reworked version of a photo by Trevor Key, which Richard Branson initially wanted to use for the cover of Tubular Bells, with the title Breakfast in Bed. Oldfield hated the idea and rejected it. The original photo showed blood dripping from the egg, which was replaced by yolk for the cover. The working title for Heaven's Open was Man in the Rain. The song "Heaven's Open" comes largely from an early version of "Man in the Rain". The "Man in the Rain" title would later be used by Oldfield as a single from the Tubular Bells III album.

Stylistically, Heaven's Open returns to the format of Oldfield's commercially oriented records of the early to mid-1980s, and features a selection of accessible pop/rock songs, as well as a more progressive long-form piece. Unlike previous albums such as Five Miles Out and Crises, the album's longer composition closes the album as opposed to opening it, as with Oldfield's album Discovery.

=== Singles ===
"Gimme Back" and the title track "Heaven's Open" were released as singles in 1991. Both were also released under the name Michael Oldfield.

=== Equipment ===
Musical equipment on the album includes Atari, C-Lab and Fairlight products. Also featured are Roland D-50, MKS-80 and D-550, an Akai S900, S1000 and S1100, an EMU Proteus, a Korg M1 a Yamaha DX5 and a Steinberg 'Topaz'. A Harrison series X mixing console, a Sony 3348 digital tape machine and microphones made by Bruel & Kjaer were used in the creation of the album.

== Track listing ==
All tracks written by Mike Oldfield.

=== Side one ===
1. "Make Make" – 4:18
2. "No Dream" – 6:02
3. "Mr. Shame" – 4:22
4. "Gimme Back" – 4:12
5. "Heaven's Open" – 4:31

=== Side two ===
1. "Music from the Balcony" – 19:44

== Personnel ==
- Mike Oldfield – vocals, guitars, keyboards
- Simon Phillips – drums
- Dave Levy – bass
- Mickey Simmonds – Hammond organ, piano
- Andrew Longhurst – additional keyboards, sequencing and samples
- Courtney Pine – saxophones, bass clarinet
- The "Sassy Choir"
  - Vicki St. James
  - Sylvia Mason-James
  - Dolly James
  - Debi Doss
  - Shirlie Roden
  - Valeria Etienne
- Additional vocal harmonies
  - Anita Hegerland
  - Nikki "B" Bentley
  - Tom Newman
