= Dolly James =

- Origin: Brunei
- Genres: R&B, Dance-pop, Soul
- Labels: Sony Music; Rondor Music; A&M Records

Dolly James is a British singer-songwriter and session singer. She released several singles in the 1990s and toured internationally with such acts as Simply Red and James Taylor Quartet.

== Biography ==
Born in Brunei, she began her career singing in local cover bands and being part of a church choir. In her late teens, she performed at the Mandarin Hotel in Singapore before leaving for the United Kingdom. She worked with cabaret bands in Wales and in the West Midlands and later as a session singer in London before pursuing her solo career.

She started writing and recording with various musicians and eventually was signed to Sony Music Publishing. During that time, she also worked as a backing vocalist in Yugoslavia, Norway and most of Europe for Dance with a Stranger, and later Simply Red, on the New Flame tour, in the Far East, Europe and the United States. She also appeared with Simply Red on the David Letterman show and numerous other US television programmes. She was later signed to Rondor and A&M Records. She also worked as a backing singer for Belinda Carlisle and Michael Bolton, making numerous UK television appearances.

In 1990, she released a 7-inch single with Andy Sheppard, entitled Bright Moments, which she performed on Jools Holland's show.

She formed her own band soon after she finished her world tour with Simply Red and won second place in the Yamaha International Musicians at the Marquee in London. Her band also performed at Womad and went on to do a residency at Ronnie Scott's in Birmingham.

She later released a white label single, Emotions, as well as numerous live and television performances with Driza Bone. In 1992 she released a 12-inch single entitled Shine Your Light, produced by Ian Lodge. In 2006 she released her first solo album, The Journey, which was produced by Dan Bull and released on her own Soular UK label.

== Discography ==
=== Singles ===
- Shine Your Light (1992)
- Emotions
- Andy Sheppard Feat. Dolly James – Bright Moments (1990)

=== Studio albums ===
- The Journey (2006)

=== Guest appearances ===
- Mike Oldfield – Heaven's Open (LP) (1991)
- Matt Bianco – Another Time Another Place (Single) (1994)
