= Far Above the Clouds =

Single by Mike Oldfield

from the album Tubular Bells III
- Released: 12 April 1999
- Genre: Progressive rock Electronica
- Length: 5:30 (Album version)
- Label: Warner Music UK
- Songwriter: Mike Oldfield
- Producer: Mike Oldfield

Mike Oldfield singles chronology
| "Man in the Rain" (1998) | "Far Above the Clouds" (1999) | "To Be Free" (2002) |

CD single 2

"Far Above the Clouds" is a single by musician Mike Oldfield, released on 12 April 1999. The single is the final track from the album Tubular Bells III. "Far Above the Clouds" similarly features tubular bells in fashion with the part-one-finales of Oldfield's previous works, Tubular Bells and Tubular Bells II. The sound of the bells has a slightly more dramatic tone than in its previous appearances, and it is a combination of actual tubular bells and sampled sounds from various keyboards, most prominently a Korg M1.

On 27 July 2012 at the 2012 Summer Olympics opening ceremony Oldfield performed renditions of Tubular Bells, "Far Above the Clouds" and "In Dulci Jubilo" during a segment about the NHS. This rendition appears on the soundtrack album Isles of Wonder.

== Charts ==
It charted at number 53 in the UK Singles Chart.

| Chart (1999) | Position |
|---|---|
| UK Singles (OCC) | 53 |

== Track listings ==
All songs written by Mike Oldfield.

=== UK CD 1 ===
1. "Far Above the Clouds" (Timewriter's Radio Mix) - 3:38
2. "Far Above the Clouds" (Jam & Spoon Mix) - 9:54
3. "Far Above the Clouds" (Original Version) - 4:48

=== UK CD 2 ===
1. "Far Above the Clouds" (Jam & Spoon - Deep Inside the Club Mix) 10:24
2. "Far Above the Clouds" (Timewriter's Big Bag of Secrets) - 6:18
3. "Far Above the Clouds" (Jam & Spoon Far Below the Bass Edit) - 3:12
