= Women of Ireland (Mike Oldfield instrumental) =

"Women of Ireland XXV"

Single by Mike Oldfield

from the album Voyager XXV: The Essential
- Released: 10 November 1997
- Genre: Celtic; Dance (Remixes)
- Length: 6:27 (Album version)
- Label: Warner Music UK
- Songwriter: Seán Ó Riada/Traditional
- Producer: Mike Oldfield

Mike Oldfield singles chronology
"Let There Be Light" (1995)	"Women of Ireland XXV" (1997)	"Tubular X" (1998)

Remix CD cover

German promo cover

"Women of Ireland" is an instrumental piece by musician Mike Oldfield, originally released in 1996. It is a version of the folk song, "Mná na hÉireann" (Women of Ireland), credited as traditional but actually written by Seán Ó Riada.

Originally from the 1996 album Voyager, it also appeared on the compilation XXV: The Essential. The single release "Women of Ireland XXV" includes two mixes of the song along with a reel tune, similar to the ending pieces of the first two Tubular Bells albums.

== Charts ==
Chart (1997)	Peak position
United Kingdom (UK Singles Chart)	70

== Track listing ==
=== CD single (Germany, 1996) ===
1. "Women of Ireland" (edit) - 3:37
2. "Women of Ireland" (12" Lurker mix – 9:10
3. "Women of Ireland" (Transient mix) – 9:38

=== CD single (1997) ===
1. "Women of Ireland" (Lurker edit) (Traditional) – 3:37
2. "Women of Ireland" (Album version) (Traditional) – 6:27
3. "Mike's Reel" (Mike Oldfield) – 3:51

The Lurker edit remix is by Henry Jackman and George Shilling.

=== Remix CD single (1997) ===
1. "Women of Ireland" (Lurker edit) (Traditional) – 3:37
2. "Women of Ireland" (System 7 12" mix) (Traditional) – 9:00
3. "Women of Ireland" (12" Lurker mix (Traditional)– 9:08
4. "Women of Ireland" (Transient mix) (Traditional) – 9:37
