= Mná na hÉireann =

"Mná na hÉireann (Women of Ireland)"

Song
- Language: English/Irish
- Genre: Folk song (Irish rebel music), Aisling
- Songwriter: Peadar Ó Doirnín
- Composers: Seán Ó Riada (most popular tune setting)

"Mná na hÉireann" (English: Women of Ireland) is a poem written by Irish poet Peadar Ó Doirnín (1700–1769), most famous as a song, and especially since set to an air composed by Seán Ó Riada (1931–1971).

Peadar Ó Doirnín lived in Forkhill in south Armagh, Ireland and is buried in Urnaí graveyard nearby in County Louth. He is best known for his song 'Úrchnoc Chéin Mhic Cáinte'. It was the editor of an anthology of his poems (1969), Dr. Breandan Ó Buachalla who gave the lyrics its title 'Mná na hÉireann'.

== Poem ==
Tá bean in Éirinn a phronnfadh séad domh is mo sháith le n-ól
Is tá bean in Éirinn is ba bhinne léithe mo ráfla ceoil
Ná seinm théad; atá bean in Éirinn is níorbh fhearr léi beo
Mise ag léimnigh nó leagtha i gcré is mo thárr faoi fhód

Tá bean in Éirinn a bheadh ag éad liom mur' bhfaighfinn ach póg
Ó bhean ar aonach, nach ait an scéala, is mo dháimh féin leo;
Tá bean ab fhearr liom nó cath is céad dhíobh nach bhfagham go deo
Is tá cailín spéiriúil ag fear gan Bhéarla, dubhghránna cróin.

Tá bean i Laighnibh is nios mhiste léithe bheith láimh liom ar bord,
Is tá bean i bhFearnmhaigh a ghéabhadh bhéarsai is is sárbhinne glór,
Bhí bean ar thaobh cnoic i gCarraig Éamoinn a níodh gáire ag ól
Is tráth bhí ina maighdean ní mise d'éignigh dá chois ó chomhar.

Tá bean a leaghfadh, nífeadh is d'fhuaifeadh cáimric is sról,
Is tá bean a dhéanfadh de dh'olainn gréas is thairnfeadh an bhró
Tá bean is b'fhearr leí ag cruinniú déirce nó cráite re cró
Is tá bean 'na ndéidh uile a luífeadh lé fear is a máthair faoi fhód

Tá bean a déarnadh an iomad tréanais is grá Dia mór,
Is tá bean nach mbéarfadh a mionna ar aon mhodh is nach n-ardódh glór;
Ach thaisbeáin saorbhean a ghlacfadh lé fear go cráifeach cóir
Nach mairfeadh a ghléas is nach mbainfeadh léithe i gcás ar domhan.

Tá bean a déarfadh dá siulfainn léi go bhfaighinn an t-ór,
Is tá bean 'na léine is fearr a méin ná táinte bó
Le bean a bhuairfeadh Baile an Mhaoir is clár Thír Eoghain,
Is ní fheicim leigheas ar mo ghalar féin ach scaird a dh'ól

=== Context ===
The verses most often performed by modern singers are the first two and the last.

The song has been sung largely out of context by the majority of singers. While normally sung as praise of, or in solidarity with, women, Oriel song academic and Ó Doirnín expert Dr. Pádraigín Ní Uallacháin has pointed out that the lyrics disparage women and refer to the rape of a young virgin in a derogatory and offensive manner. In referring to various types of women and their availability, or otherwise, to the poet, he refers to a woman from his own locality near Forkhill, County Armagh:

There was a woman from the mountainside of Carrickedmond

who used to laugh when she was drunk, Once was a virgin, it wasn't me

Who forcibly spread her two legs apart.

It is accepted that most singers who have recorded this song did not fully understand the lyrics due to inaccurate translations, the exclusion of verses in previous recordings or the lack of understanding of the nuances and metaphorical usage of Irish language terminology.

Ní Uallacháin's 2023 translation and reference notes below reveals the true meaning of the lyrics.

=== Ní Uallacháin translation (2023) ===
Mná na hÉireann

There's a woman in Ireland who would bestow a charm on me or plenty to drink
And there's a woman in Ireland and my gossiping song would be sweeter to her
Than harp music; there's a woman in Ireland who would prefer nothing more
Than me to be mating, rather than my lower belly under the sod

There's a woman in Ireland who would be jealous of me if I were only to get a kiss
From a woman at the fair, how odd is that, and me inclined to them both;
There's a woman I'd prefer than a battalion and a hundred women that I'll never have
And an ugly black-nosed man with no English has a pretty girl

There's a woman in Leinster who wouldn't mind being in hand along with me
And there's a woman in Farney who would recite verses with the sweetest of voice
There was a woman on the side of a hill in Carrickedmond who used to laugh when she drank
Once was a virgin, it wasn't me who forced (raped) her two legs apart.

There's a woman who would soak, wash and sew cambric and satin
And there's a woman who would make as much knitted wool as would hide the swelling belly
And there's a woman who would rather go begging or tortured with offspring (?),
And there's a woman who after all that would lie with a man and her mother dead.

There's a woman who would do too much abstinence and too much God loving
And there's a woman who wouldn't swear in any way or raise her voice;
But one fine woman who would receive a man piously and with propriety
Showed that his 'instrument' wouldn't sustain it, so wouldn't meddle with her under any circumstance.

There's a woman who says that if I were to court her I'd get the gold;
And there's a woman in her shift and her beauty is worth more than herds of cattle
Of the woman who would disturb Ballymoyer and the plains of Tyrone.
And there's no cure for my disease but a slug of drink.

=== Notes ===
1. 'Léim' – to breed. (Léim ar leithligh = illegitimate child);
2. 'Tárr' – lower belly/ genital area
3. Carrickedmond townland in the author's home county, County Louth.
4. 'Éignigh' – raped
5. 'ó chomhar' – apart
6. 'Tairnfeadh' – reduce/diminish/hide
7. 'bró' = brú – belly as in Brú na Bóinne
8. 'Cró' can mean many things including dowry/ironbar/children. Preceded by re le – can mean 'with dowry' or with 'children' (i.e. married)
9. 'Gléas' = instrument i.e. penis. See also last verse of Ó Doirnín's poem Úrchnoc Chéin Mhic Cáinte with reference to 'gléas'
10. 'Siúil' (le cailín) means to court (a girl)
11. 'Go bhfaighinn an t-ór' - getting the gold in folksong can mean woman's honour or virginity
12. 'Léine' means shift/nightdress

== Translations in song ==
=== Michael Davitt translation ===
This translation (of the same three verses) is by Michael Davitt. Davitt plays with the second couplet of each verse, reversing the meaning and turning the poem into the song of a womanising drunkard, who favours no particular woman (second verse), resorts to drink instead of avoiding it (third verse—though this may be ironic in the original), and whom his lover wants dead (first verse).

Mná na hÉireann

There's a woman in Erin who'd give me shelter and my fill of ale;
There's a woman in Ireland who'd prefer my strains to strings being played;
There's a woman in Eirinn and nothing would please her more
Than to see me burning or in a grave lying cold.

There's a woman in Eirinn who'd be mad with envy if I was kissed
By another on fair-day, they have strange ways, but I love them all;
There are women I'll always adore, battalions of women and more
And there's this sensuous beauty and she shackled to an ugly boar.

There's a woman who promised if I'd wander with her I'd find some gold
A woman in night dress with a loveliness worth more than the woman
Who vexed Ballymoyer and the plain of Tyrone;
And the only cure for my pain I'm sure is the ale-house down the road.

=== Kate Bush translation ===
This is the translation for the version performed by Kate Bush on the album Common Ground – Voices of Modern Irish Music. No translator is given, but the song is credited as arranged by Bush with Dónal Lunny and Fiachra Trench.

Mná na hÉireann

There's a woman in Ireland who'd give me a gem and my fill to drink,
There's a woman in Ireland to whom my singing is sweeter than the music of strings
There's a woman in Ireland who would much prefer me leaping
Than laid in the clay and my belly under the sod

There's a woman in Ireland who'd envy me if I got naught but a kiss
From a woman at a fair, isn't it strange, and the love I have for them
There's a woman I'd prefer to a battalion, and a hundred of them whom I will never get
And an ugly, swarthy man with no English has a beautiful girl

There's a woman who would say that if I walked with her I'd get the gold
And there's the woman of the shirt whose mien is better than herds of cows
With a woman who would deafen Baile an Mhaoir and the plain of Tyrone
And I see no cure for my disease but to drink a torrent

== Recordings ==
- 1969 – Ceoltóirí Chualann (lead vocal by Seán O Sé), Ó Riada Sa Gaiety
- 1973 – The Chieftains, The Chieftains 4
- 1976 – Bob James, Bob James Three (instrumental)
- 1978 – Davy Graham, The Complete Guitarist (instrumental)
- 1983 – Oakenshield, Across The Narrow Seas (instrumental)
- 1986 – Ronnie Montrose, Territory (instrumental)
- 1989 – The Christians (melody used for the song Words, reached #18 in the UK Singles Chart)
- 1989 – Andy Davis, Clevedon Pier (instrumental)
- 1995 – Alan Stivell, Brian Boru (sung in Irish)
- 1995 – Susan McKeown, Bones (sung in Irish)
- 1995 – Sinéad O'Connor, Ain't Nuthin' But a She Thing, MTV special (sung in Irish)
- 1996 – Kate Bush, Common Ground - Voices of Modern Irish Music (sung in Irish)
- 1996 – Mike Oldfield, instrumental version, Voyager.
- 1997 – Susan McKeown, Snakes (sung in Irish)
- 1998 – Sarah Brightman, version titled So Many Things on Eden
- 1999 – Sarah Brightman, One Night in Eden (live DVD, Sun City, South Africa)
- 2010 – Sharon Corr, Dream of You
- 2010 – Nolwenn Leroy Bretonne
- 2013 – Jeff Beck, Crossroads Guitar Festival album
- 2016 – Dexys Midnight Runners, Let The Record Show: Dexys Do Irish And Country Soul
- 2018 – Celtic Woman, Ancient Land
- 2019 – Sibéal, Sibéal
- 2020 – Patricia Petibon, Susan Manoff and Ronan Lebars, L'Amour, la Mort, La Mer
- 2024 — Celtic Woman, 20, “Is Sinne Mna Na hEireann (20th Anniversary Edition)”

=== Use in film and television ===
"Women of Ireland" has been used in various film and television productions.

- The Chieftains version of the song features prominently on the soundtrack to Stanley Kubrick's 1975 film Barry Lyndon.
- Soundtrack of a Levi's jeans advertisement.
- This was also the slow air whistled by Emilio Estevez as Billy the Kid in the 1988 western film, Young Guns.
- A partial instrumental version is used in the soundtrack of the 1999 Chinese film Postmen in the Mountains.
- An instrumental version of the song was used as background music in the 2009 BBC documentary about the mixed fortunes of the Harris Tweed industry.
- An adaptation of the Chieftains version is featured in Carl Colpaert's 2010 film The Land of the Astronauts.
- Used in courtship scene of Robin & Marion in Ridley Scott's 2010 film Robin Hood.
