= Jody Linscott =

American session musician

- Genres: Soundtracks; popular music
- Occupation: Musician
- Instrument: Percussion
- Label: Various
- Member of: Kokomo

Jody Linscott is an American session musician and percussionist who resides in England and maintains an extended discography. She has two daughters Kachina Dechert and Coco Linscott and has written two children's books which were published by Doubleday, both edited by Jackie Onassis. Linscott has written several songs to accompany the books.

== Early days ==
Jody Linscott was born in the United States and grew up in Braintree, Massachusetts, but went to England on a holiday in 1971 and never returned. While studying to be a bookbinder she repaired items, and once repaired a conga drum that the owner never returned to claim. After seeing a poster at the African Centre in Covent Garden for "Mustapha Tete Ade – Master Drummer from Ghana," she took the drum to his rhythms class to learn African rhythms. The class instructor, a visitor from Africa who was associated with the British Consulate, recognized her as a natural talent and offered to give her private lessons. Afterward, Linscott built a full set of congas from fibreglass and found a blacksmith to provide the hardware. She worked as a waitress at Dingwalls in Camden Town and kept the congas in the cloakroom to jam with the bands that played there.

Her professional break came when she played with the band Kokomo one evening, and was hired by the band as a percussionist. The band signed with Epic Records through Steve O'Rourke, Pink Floyd's manager, who then took over management of the band Kokomo. Linscott went on to work with Robert Palmer on the album Sneakin' Sally Through the Alley. Later she heard that Palmer was looking for a percussionist to go on tour, and after contacting him was hired. Linscott built her own percussion rack for the tour to provide a variety of creative sounds, and toured with Palmer in America for about two years. Afterward she went on to work with a number of other prominent professional groups and musicians.

== Career ==
Jody Linscott has worked with a number of well-known musicians, including Jaki Graham, Dido, Elton John, The Who, Mike Oldfield, Billy Bragg, Eric Clapton, Phil Collins, Christopher Cross, David Gilmour, Roger Daltrey, Ray Davies, John Entwistle, John Wesley Harding, Kokomo, Stevie Wonder, Patti LaBelle, Nils Lofgren, John Mayall, Robert Palmer, Pet Shop Boys, Simon Phillips, David Sanborn, Pete Townshend, Jay-Z, Avril Lavigne, Tom Jones, Daryl Hall, Atomic Kitten, Blue, Bryan Adams, Don Henley, The Bee Gees, Dan Fogelberg, The Clash, Billy Squier, Snowy White, Paul McCartney, Hamish Stuart, Sam Brown, Joan Armatrading, The Waterboys, Bryan Ferry, Take That, Natasha Bedingfield, Will Young, John Illsley, John Hall and Swing Out Sister, Robbie McIntosh.

Linscott has toured as percussionist for The Who, David Gilmour and Elton John. In 1994 she appeared in A Celebration: The Music of Pete Townshend and The Who, also known as Daltrey Sings Townshend. This was a two-night concert at Carnegie Hall produced by Roger Daltrey of English rock band The Who in celebration of his fiftieth birthday. Linscott worked with Paul McCartney on the soundtrack of Give My Regards to Broad Street and also performed in the 2007 Princess Diana Tribute concert, playing percussion in the house band/orchestra. She has also toured and worked with Mike Oldfield including the concert at Horse Guards Parade, London 1998.

== Filmography ==
Linscott has appeared in a number of films and videos, including:

- All the Best Cowboys Have Chinese Eyes (1982)
- Give My Regards to Broad Street (1984)
- David Gilmour: Live At Hammersmith Odeon (1984)
- Pete Townshend: Deep End Live! (1985)
- Elton John: "Live in Australia, Tour de Force" (1986)
- Stand by Me: AIDS Day Benefit (1987)
- The Who Live at Giants Stadium (1989)
- A Celebration: The Music of Pete Townshend and The Who (1994)
- The Who: Thirty Years of Maximum R&B (1994)
- MasterCard Masters of Music Concert for The Prince's Trust (1996)
- Mike Oldfield: Tubular Bells III premiere in Horse Guards Parade London (1998)
- Mike Oldfield: The Millennium Bell Live in Berlin (1999)
- Pete Townshend: VH1 Storytellers (2000) (TV)
- Pete Townshend: Music From Lifehouse (2000)
- Dido Live (2005)
- The Who: Tommy and Quadrophenia Live with Special Guests (1997 production, 2005 release)
- Don Henley: All She Wants to Do Is Dance
