= Pepsi & Shirlie =

English pop duo

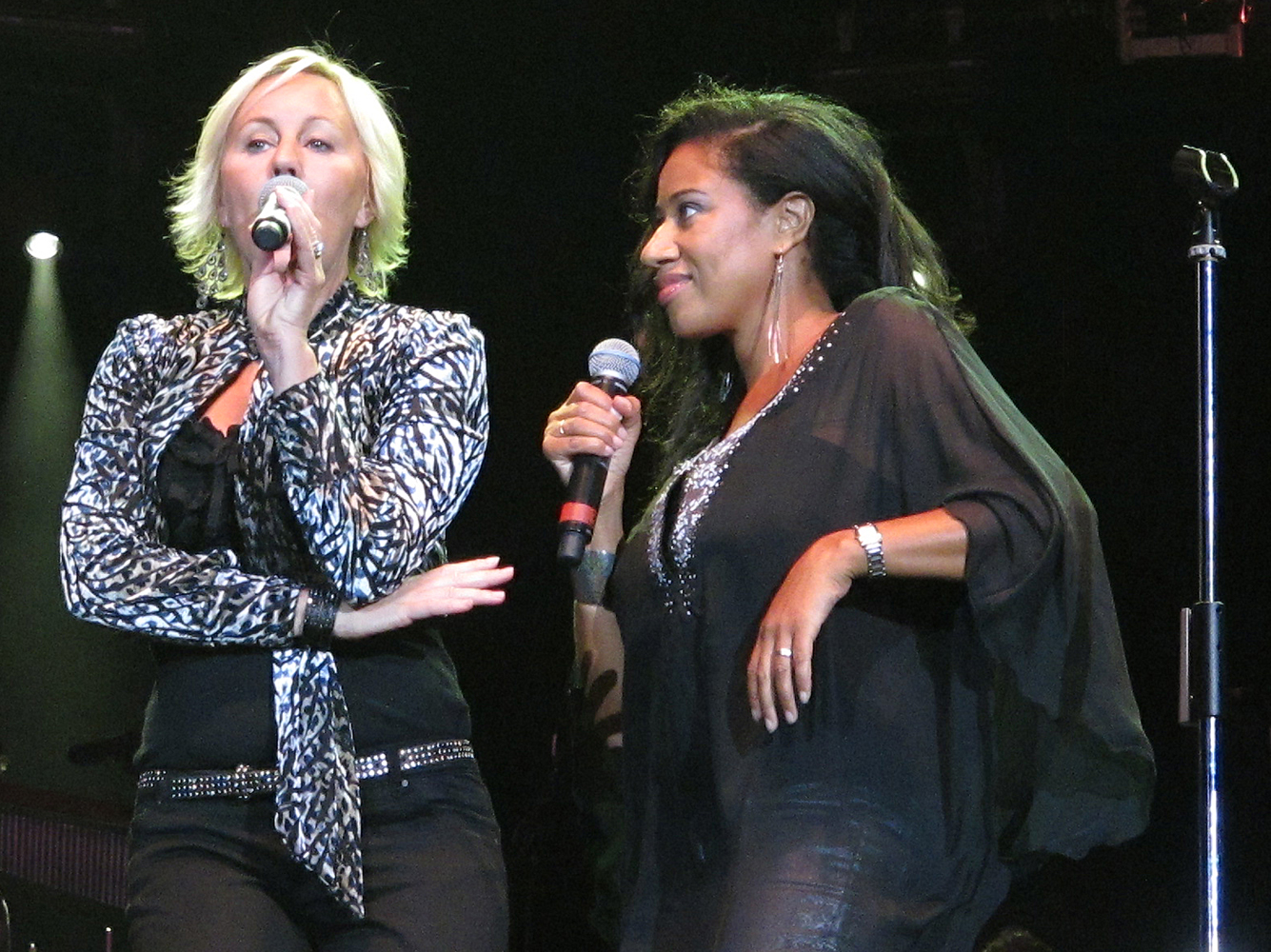
- Shirlie (left) and Pepsi (right) performing at the Echo Arena, Liverpool on 25 June 2011

Background information
- Origin: London, England, United Kingdom
- Genres: Pop; dance-pop
- Years active: 1985–1991; 2000; 2011
- Label: Polydor
- Past members: Helen DeMacque; Shirlie Holliman

Pepsi & Shirlie were an English pop duo group formed in London in 1985 by two backing singers for Wham! They released two albums, All Right Now in 1987 and Change in 1991, and their debut single "Heartache" reached number 2 in the UK Singles Chart.

== Career ==
The act comprised Helen "Pepsi" DeMacque (born 10 December 1958, Paddington, London) and Shirlie Holliman (born 18 April 1962, Watford, Hertfordshire), who had been Wham! backing vocalists. Holliman's original singing partner, Dee C. Lee, had earlier left the group to join the Style Council and later married its lead vocalist Paul Weller.

Although DeMacque had ambitions to be a solo performer after Wham!, Holliman convinced her that it would be best to proceed as a duo.

In 1987, they released their debut single "Heartache", which was produced by Phil Fearon and Tambi Fernando and reached number 2 in the UK Singles Chart. "Heartache" also peaked at number two on the American dance charts. Although featuring a credit for super producers Stock Aitken Waterman on many pressings of the single, "Heartache" was never worked on by the trio – with all additional production work and remixing done by Pete Hammond on behalf of Pete Waterman.

The follow-up single, "Goodbye Stranger", produced by Fernando and Hammond, reached number 9. Subsequent singles and their debut album All Right Now, released later in the year, were commercially unsuccessful. During this era, the act's tours included a concert performed in Amman, Jordan.

In 1991, they returned with the album Change and its lead single "Someday", a song produced by George Michael. Holliman recalled Michael writing the song from scratch during the recording session, after accepting her request to help out with their comeback. Neither the album nor the single attracted much attention, the album not even charting in the UK.

DeMacque worked with Michael again in 1995, when the two pseudonymously released a cover of the Dead or Alive classic "You Spin Me Round" under the name Infamy.

Pepsi & Shirlie returned in 2000 to record their backing vocals on Geri Halliwell's UK number one hit "Bag It Up". The duo also re-united for the "Here & Now 10th Anniversary tour" starting on 24 June 2011.

Their memoir It's All in Black and White was published by Welbeck in September 2021.

== Discography ==
=== Studio albums ===
List of albums, with selected details and chart positions
Title	Details	Peak chart positions	
Title	Details	UK	AUS
All Right Now	Released: 26 October 1987; Label: Polydor; Formats: CD, CS, LP	69	99
Change	Released: 1991; Label: Polydor; Formats: CD, CS, LP	—	—
"—" denotes a recording that did not chart or was not released in that territory.

=== Singles ===
List of singles, with selected chart positions and certifications, showing year released
Title	Year	Peak chart positions													Certifications
Title	Year	UK	AUS	US Dance	US	IRE	SWI	NOR	GER	NLD	ATR	BEL	FRA	NZ	Certifications
"Heartache"	1987	2	49	2	78	3	2	6	8	2	17	2	31	9	BPI: Silver
"Goodbye Stranger"	1987	9	—	26	—	5	5	—	31	28	—	8	—	39	
"Can't Give Me Love"	1987	58	—	—	—	21	—	—	—	89	—	23	—	—	
"All Right Now"	1987	50	65	—	66	—	—	—	—	—	—	—	—	—	
"Hightime"	1988	79	—	—	—	—	—	—	—	—	—	—	—	—	
"What's Going On Inside Your Head?"	1989	—	—	—	—	—	—	—	—	—	—	—	—	—	
"Someday"	1991	78	—	—	—	80	—	—	—	—	—	—	—	200	
"—" denotes a recording that did not chart or was not released in that territory.
