= Guitars (Mike Oldfield album) =

Studio album by Mike Oldfield
- Released: 24 May 1999
- Recorded: Roughwood Studio, Buckinghamshire
- Genres: Progressive rock, new age
- Length: 42:40
- Label: WEA
- Producer: Mike Oldfield

Mike Oldfield chronology
Tubular Bells III (1998)	Guitars (1999)	The Millennium Bell (1999)

Professional ratings
Review scores
Source	Rating
Allmusic	2.5/5 stars

Guitars is the nineteenth studio album written and performed by English musician Mike Oldfield, released in 1999. The concept of the album was to only perform it using guitar-like instruments.

== Background ==
Oldfield plays all the music on the album, using only guitars of various types. This includes using Roland MIDI-equipped guitars to trigger drum samples and produce string-like sounds. "Four Winds" is a four-part work, whose sections are musical portraits of the four compass points (north, south, east and west).

The Live Then & Now 1999 tour was in promotion of this album and Tubular Bells III.

== Track listing ==
1. "Muse" – 2:12
2. "Cochise" – 5:15
3. "Embers" – 3:51
4. "Summit Day" – 3:46
5. "Out of Sight" – 3:48
6. "B. Blues" – 4:30
7. "Four Winds" – 9:32
8. "Enigmatism" – 3:32
9. "Out of Mind" – 3:46
10. "From the Ashes" – 2:28

== Inner cover photo ==
The liner notes has a photo of Oldfield surrounded by some of his guitars, which he used on the album. From the classical (Spanish acoustic) guitar at the top (and slightly to the right) going clockwise, the guitars are as follows:

- José Ramírez Classical guitar
- Fender Stratocaster, salmon pink (1962)
- Martin O-45 Parlour Guitar
- PRS Custom 24 with Roland synth pickup
- Fender Stratocaster, sunburst (1972)
- PRS Custom 24
- José Ramirez Flamenco guitar
- Wal 4 string bass guitar
- PRS McCarty Thinline

== Charts ==
Chart performance for Guitars
Chart (1999)	Peak position
Hungarian Albums (MAHASZ)	4

== Certifications and sales ==
Region	Certification	Certified units/sales
Spain (Promusicae)	Platinum	100,000^{^}
^{^} Shipments figures based on certification alone.
