= Heaven's Open (song) =

Single by Mike Oldfield

from the album Heaven's Open
- Released: 28 January 1991
- Recorded: 1990
- Genre: Rock; progressive rock
- Length: 4:31
- Label: Virgin Records
- Songwriter: Michael Oldfield
- Producer: Thom Newman

Mike Oldfield singles chronology
"Etude" (1990)	"Heaven's Open" (1991)	"Gimme Back" (1991)

"Heaven's Open" is a single by musician Mike Oldfield, released in 1991 (see 1991 in music). It was the lead single from the album of the same name. The various formats were backed by a mix of the A-side which featured a melodic guitar line not included in the album version, along with two excerpts from Amarok, Oldfield's previous album.

Oldfield was credited as "Michael" on this release, while producer and long-term collaborator Tom Newman was listed as "Thom Newman". This is also from the last of Oldfield's albums with Virgin Records.

== Demo version ==
The song that became "Heaven's Open", was originally an early version of "Man in the Rain", planned for Oldfield's Islands album, with vocals by Barry Palmer. To get a 'loose' feel to the song, Oldfield encouraged the musicians to have a few drinks; this version however was deemed as too loose and not used.

Oldfield performed the vocals himself on the final version.

== Music video ==
The music video is available on the Elements – The Best of Mike Oldfield and is part cartoon and part live action. Oldfield sings, plays guitar and looks into a crystal ball. Oldfield plays a PRS Artist Custom in the video. The animated content is sourced from a film called Album by Croatian film company called Zagreb Film.

== Track listing ==
1. "Heaven's Open" – 4:31
2. "Amarok" (excerpt I) – 3:09
3. "Heaven's Open" (12" mix) – 4:33
4. "Amarok" (excerpt V) – 2:29
