= Es Cubells =

- Village
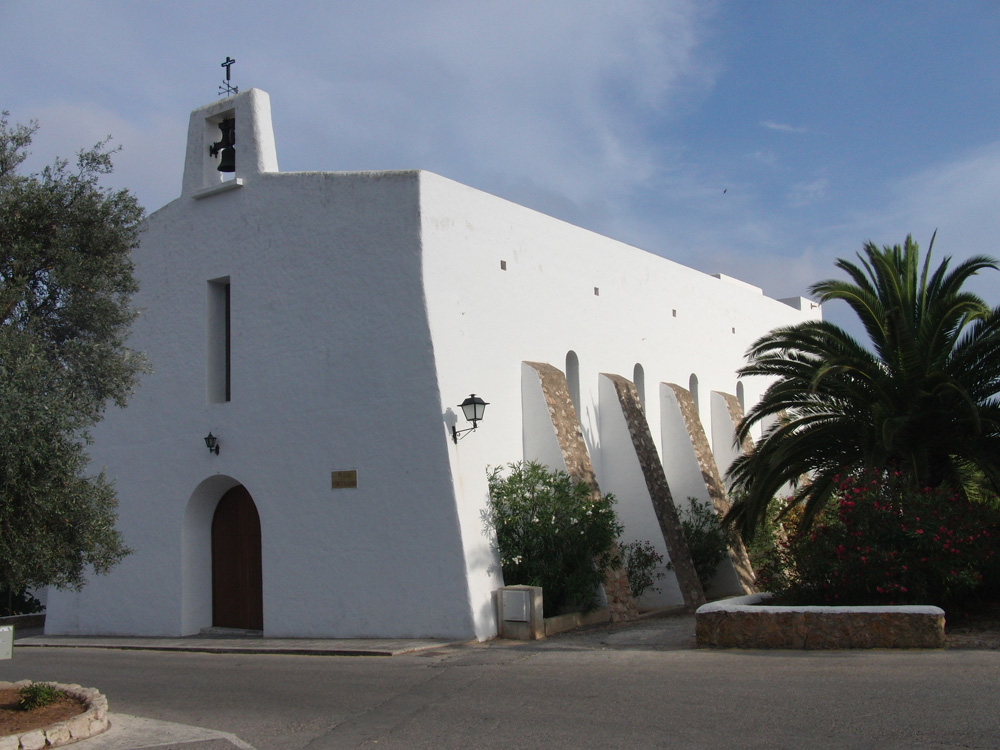
- The Church at Es Cubells

- Location of the village in Ibiza
- Coordinates: 38°52′45″N 1°16′19″E
- Country: Spain
- Region: Balearic Islands

Population (2006)
  - Total: 807
- Time zone: UTC+1 (CET)
  - Summer (DST): UTC+2 (CEST)

Es Cubells is a small village in the southwest of the Spanish island of Ibiza. The village is in the municipality of Sant Josep de sa Talaia. The village is reached along the road EI-703. The village is 10.6 miles (17.1 km) southwest of Ibiza Town and 8.1 miles (13.0 km) of Ibiza Airport.

Es Cubells is known for its church facing the sea. It is whitewashed and has lateral buttresses. It was founded in 1864 through the effort of a Carmelite friar called Francisco Palau, who played an important role in the island’s history, since he spent long periods of his life as a hermit in the islet of es Vedrà. The original church was destroyed in the Spanish Civil War. The church existing today was built in 1957 and blends to its surroundings. The church’s traditional style, immaculate square and gardens, and dramatic clifftop location make it a popular site for weddings.

Near the church, standing at the top of the cliffs of Es Cubells, is a monument to fishermen, erected in 1996.
