= Tattoo (Mike Oldfield instrumental) =

Single by Mike Oldfield

from the album Tubular Bells II
- Released: 30 November 1992
- Genre: New-age, progressive rock, Scottish
- Length: 3:41
- Label: Warner Music UK
- Songwriter: Mike Oldfield
- Producers: Mike Oldfield; Trevor Horn

Mike Oldfield singles chronology
"Sentinel" (1992)	"Tattoo" (1992)	"The Bell" (1993)

Live at Edinburgh Castle EP

"Tattoo" is a single by musician Mike Oldfield, released in 1992. It is from the album Tubular Bells II. There were two singles released for "Tattoo", one being called the Live at Edinburgh Castle EP.

One of the B-sides is Oldfield's instrumental rendition of the Christmas carol "Silent Night".

== Charts ==
It charted at number 33 in the UK Singles Chart.

Chart (1992)	Position
UK Singles Chart	33

== Track listing ==
=== CD single ===
1. "Tattoo" (edit) – 3:41
2. "Sentinel" (live) – 8:06
3. "Silent Night" – 4:19

=== Live at Edinburgh Castle EP ===
1. "Tattoo" – 3:44
2. "Maya Gold" – 4:10
3. "Moonshine" – 1:42
4. "Reprise" – 1:20
