= All Right Now (album) =

Studio album by Pepsi & Shirlie
- Released: 26 October 1987
- Recorded: July 1985 – May 1986
- Genre: Dance-pop
- Label: Polydor
- Producers: Tambi Fernando (tracks 1, 3, 4, 6, 7), Phil Fearon (track 1), Chris Porter (tracks 5 and 8), Gary Langham (track 2), Pete Hammond (track 6), Chris Cameron (tracks 5 and 8), Pepsi DeMacque (tracks 5 and 8), Shirlie Holliman (tracks 5 and 8)

Pepsi & Shirlie chronology
All Right Now (1987)	Change (1991)

All Right Now is the 1987 debut album by vocalists Pepsi & Shirlie. The album gave two top 10 hits in the UK for the duo: "Heartache" (No. 2) and "Goodbye Stranger" (No. 9). The other three singles fared less well, hitting below the top 40 of the UK Singles Chart (although "Can't Give Me Love" attained more respectable peaks of No. 21 in Ireland and No. 23 in the Flanders region of Belgium). Pepsi & Shirlie produced two of the tracks themselves: "What's Going On Inside Your Head?" and "Crime of Passion".

Professional ratings
Review scores
Source	Rating
New Musical Express	10/10
Number One	3/5 stars
Smash Hits	6/10

== Track listing ==
1. "Heartache" (Iris Fernando, Tambi Fernando, Wayne Brown) – 3:38
2. "Lovers' Revolution" (Tambi Fernando, Pepsi DeMacque, Shirlie Holliman) – 3:37
3. "Can't Give Me Love" (Iris Fernando, Tambi Fernando, Wayne Brown) – 3:41
4. "Hightime" (Nia Peeples, Paul Gurvitz) – 5:43
5. "What's Going On Inside Your Head?" (Darryl K. Roberts, Marilyn McLeod) – 4:19
6. "Goodbye Stranger" (Iris Fernando, Tambi Fernando, Wayne Brown) – 3:34
7. "Surrender" (Pepsi DeMacque, Shirlie Holliman, Tambi Fernando) – 4:05
8. "Crime of Passion" (Ian Prince, Pepsi DeMacque) – 3:47
9. "All Right Now" (Andy Fraser, Paul Rodgers) – 3:58
10. "Goodbye Stranger" (Bonus Beats) (Iris Fernando, Tambi Fernando, Wayne Brown) – 7:21
11. "Heartache" (Dot & Daisy's Club Remix) (Iris Fernando, Tambi Fernando, Wayne Brown) – 7:40

After being expanded and remastered, the album was reissued by Cherry Pop in April 2011, with the following tracks:

1. "Heartache" – 3:38
2. "Lovers' Revolution" – 3:36
3. "Can't Give Me Love" – 3:42
4. "Hightime" (Jellybean Remix) – 3:43
5. "What's Going On Inside Your Head?" – 4:20
6. "Goodbye Stranger" – 3:34
7. "Surrender" – 4:06
8. "Crime of Passion" – 3:49
9. "All Right Now" – 3:38
10. "Who's Gonna Catch You (When You Fall)?" (Stock Aitken Waterman) – 3:25
11. "Feels Like the First Time" (Pepsi DeMacque, Shirlie Holliman, Chris Cameron) – 4:29
12. "Dreaming" (Pepsi DeMacque, Shirlie Holliman) – 4:52
13. "It's a Shame" (Pepsi DeMacque, Shirlie Holliman, Phil Fearon) – 4:20
14. "Heartache" (Dot & Daisy's Club Remix) – 7:39
15. "Goodbye Stranger" (Extended Version) – 7:21
16. "Can't Give Me Love" (Extended Version) – 6:54
17. "Who's Gonna Catch You (When You Fall)?" (Extended Version) – 5:59

== Charts ==
Chart (1987)	Peak position
Australia (Kent Music Report)	99
United Kingdom (Official Charts)	69
United States (Billboard 200)	133

== Cover versions ==
In 1987, Hong Kong singer Sandy Lam covered "Heartache" in Cantonese as the title track on her fourth album Grey. In 1988, Hong Kong singer Priscilla Chan covered "What's Going On Inside Your Head?" in Cantonese. The album's title track is itself a cover of a 1970 single by rock band Free.
