= Nicola Emmanuelle =

English jazz singer

- Born: London, England
- Genres: Jazz; pop
- Occupations: Vocalist; songwriter
- Instruments: Vocals
- Years active: 1987–present
- Website: nicolaemmanuelle.com

Nicola Emmanuelle is an English jazz singer from London, England.

== Music career ==
Emmanuelle was invited by composer George Fenton and Richard Attenborough to sing the opening score "Crossroads – a Dawn Raid" to the successful British film Cry Freedom.

This led to numerous musical and film collaborations in the late '80s, notably with the BBC, singing on Death is Part of the Process, then with Pete Townshend on his The Iron Man Musical album and with Phil Fearon of Galaxy where she branched into pop music with Touch.

Between 1990 and 1997 Emmanuelle stopped performing live, instead working behind the scenes; and it wasn’t until 1998 when George Fenton called her back to the live scene for a BBC live radio Christmas concert "Christmas at the Movies" with Attenborough and Alan Bennett.

This sudden return led to her working with Gabrielle Yared on the movie soundtrack of City of Angels, and again with George Fenton for the "Mandela Benefit Concert" at the Royal Albert Hall followed the next year with her and Gabrielle Yared both debuting at The Proms.

Emmanuelle also worked in 1999 with Mike Oldfield on his Millennium album The Millennium Bell, performing with him in Berlin for Germany’s Millennium celebrations.

While concentrating on movie soundtracks over the next six years, including Pride (2004), Duma (2005), Racing Stripes (2004), Tsotsi (2005) and The Constant Gardener (2001), Emmanuelle started writing again, culminating in her returning from 2007 to her first love of jazz. She has been working with her band ever since, performing at venues across the UK and Europe, writing and singing her own material as well as original arrangements of the classic American Songbook.

In 2010 she released her first solo jazz album Orry as a collaboration of her own BuckOrrLinDill and Splashpoint records.

== Discography ==
=== As leader ===
- Orry (2011)
