= The Bell (Mike Oldfield song) =

1993 single by Mike Oldfield

Single by Mike Oldfield

from the album Tubular Bells II
- A-side: "The Bell"
- B-side: "Sentinel"
- Released: 5 April 1993
- Genre: New-age, progressive rock
- Length: 4:06
- Label: Warner Music UK
- Songwriter: Mike Oldfield
- Producers: Mike Oldfield; Trevor Horn

Mike Oldfield singles chronology
"Tattoo" (1992)	"The Bell" (1993)	"Moonlight Shadow" (1993)

"The Bell" is a song by musician Mike Oldfield, first released on the 1992 album Tubular Bells II. It was released as a single in April 1993 by Warner Music. The single features a restructured, shorter version of the album version of the song.

== Master of Ceremonies and instruments ==
"The Bell" is the finale of section one of Tubular Bells II and features a Master of Ceremonies, who introduces the instruments. The single has many versions of "The Bell", with different MCs. They include Billy Connolly, Carlos Finaly (in Spanish), Viv Stanshall, Otto (in English and German) and John Gordon Sinclair (live). The performer on the album was Alan Rickman, although credited as A strolling player. Some releases also include an instrumental version and remixes.

The instruments introduced are, in order: grand piano, reed & pipe organ, glockenspiel, bass guitar, vocal cords, "two slightly sampled electric guitars", "the Venetian effect", "digital sound processor" and tubular bells. "The Venetian Effect" refers to a characteristic mandolin technique, a type of tremolo known as bisbigliando, in which the effect of sustained notes is achieved by repetition.

One of the MCs from the single releases, Viv Stanshall, had been the Master of Ceremonies for the equivalent "Finale" piece of the original 1973 Tubular Bells, on which "The Bell" was based.

The Connolly and Stanshall versions of the piece are available on the Warner compilation album The Best of Mike Oldfield: 1992–2003.

== Artwork ==
The single was released in the UK with multiple cover artworks, each with its own track listing, with a version of Oldfield's trademark tubular bell logo in the foreground. The US release used the cover shown at the top of this article depicting a forest river. Other covers included a yellow field landscape, mountainous landscape and a cityscape with a green bell. Additionally "The Bell / Sentinel Restructure" cover features a blue background with a red inverted bell.

== Track listing ==
=== Forest river cover / US release ===
1. "The Bell" (edit) – 4:06
2. "Sentinel Restructure" (Trance mix) (Tommy Musto) – 5:42
3. "Sentinel Restructure" (Satoshi Tomii interpretation) – 7:41
4. "Sentinel Restructure" (Global lust mix) (Mark Lewis) – 5:55
5. "Sentinel Restructure" (Nobel prize mix) (The Orb) – 12:26
6. "Sentinel Restructure" (Tubular beats) (Tommy Musto) – 4:14

=== Field cover ===
1. "The Bell" (MC Viv Stanshall) – 3:28
2. "Sentinel Restructure" (Trance mix) (Tommy Musto) – 5:42
3. "Sentinel Restructure" (Global lust mix) (Mark Lewis) – 5:55
4. "Sentinel Restructure" (Satoshi Tomii interpretation) – 7:41

=== Metallic cityscape cover ===
1. "The Bell" (Live – MC John Gordon Sinclair) – 4:19
2. "The Bell" (MC Billy Connolly) – 3:29
3. "The Bell" (MC Otto – German version) – 3:29
4. "The Bell" (MC Strolling Player (Alan Rickman)) – 5:00
5. "The Bell" (Instrumental) – 3:30

=== Mountain cover ===
1. "The Bell" (MC Viv Stanshall) – 3:28
2. "The Bell" (MC Otto – English version) – 3:28
3. "The Bell" (MC Otto – German version) – 3:28

=== Mike Oldfield Photography cover ===
1. "The Bell" (MC Carlos Finaly – Spanish version) – 3:28
