= Chris Apps =

British bagpiper

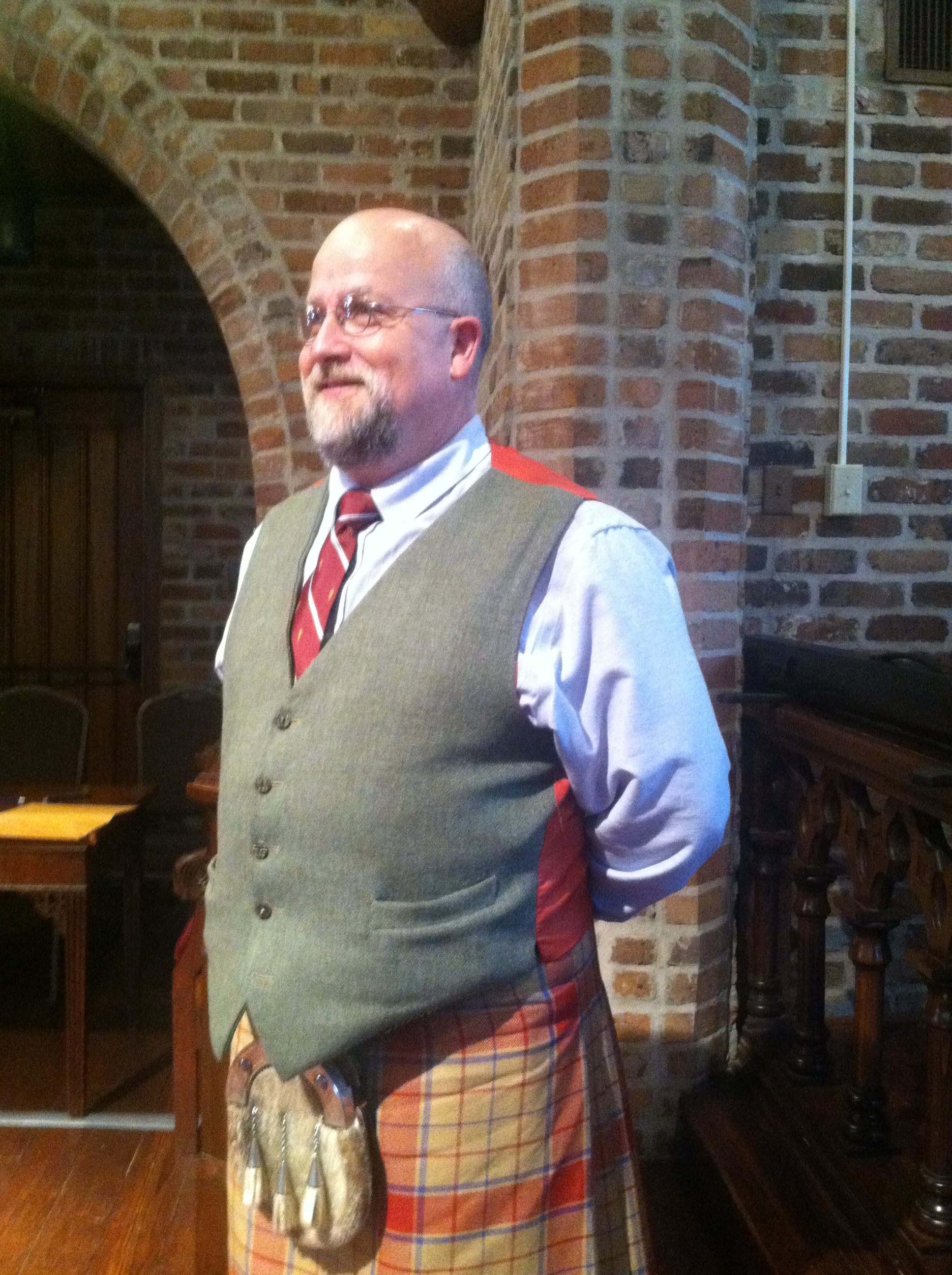

Chris Apps is a bagpiper and reed-maker.

== Early life ==
Apps began playing the bagpipes at the age of 10. At age 14 he became involved with the Scottish Piping Society of London, for whom he would eventually judge at competitions. In 1986 he was invited to join the Kansas City St Andrews Pipes and Drums Grade I band and lived in Missouri until 1989, when he returned to England.

He has donated chanter reeds to The National Youth Pipe Band of Scotland and has now retired from performing in competitions. He now plays individual gigs around the St. Louis area.

== Chris Apps Reeds ==
In 1991 Apps founded his own reed-making business. Unable to learn reed-making from other pipers, he went to the Royal College of Music in London and learned to create bassoon reeds. He then modified the equipment for bassoon reeds to create bagpipe reeds. The modified equipment meant that he could create a reed composed of one part, rather than an assembly.

His reeds were used by Clan Sutherland when they won the Grade II competition and Champion of Champions at the Cowal Highland Gathering. He designed the plastic drone reeds for David Naill & Co as a derivative of a second-generation Henderson reed, and after making smallpipe reeds he moved on to cane chanter reeds, which received good reviews.
