= Helen DeMacque =

British pop singer (born 1958)

Pepsi DeMacque
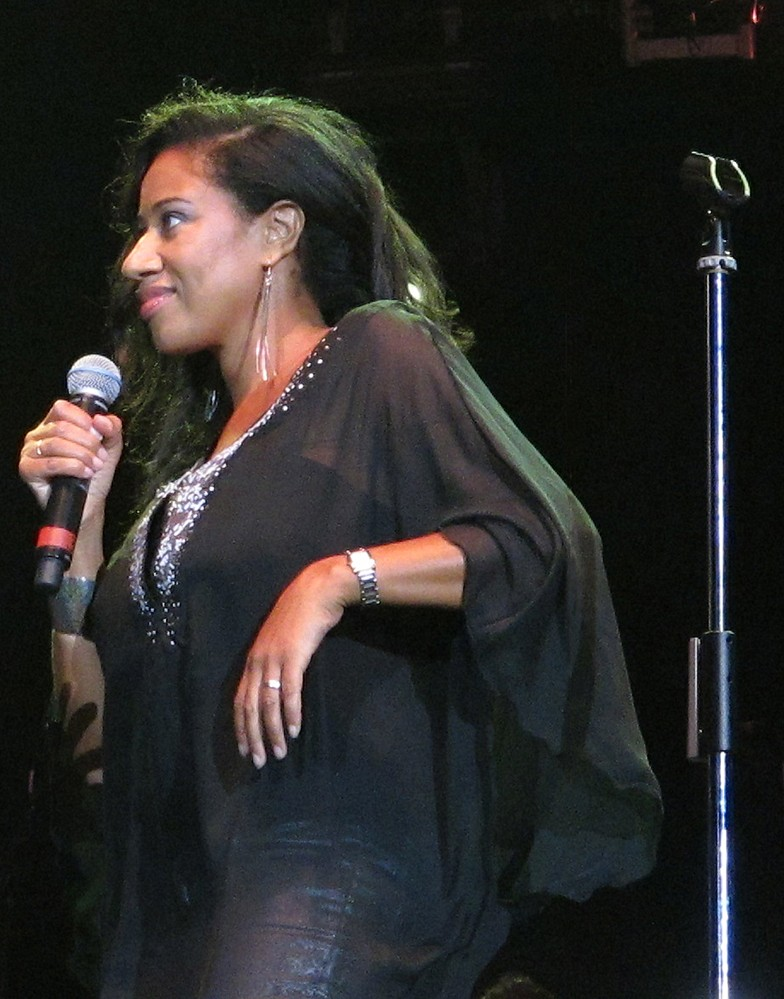
- DeMacque performing as part of Pepsi & Shirlie at the Liverpool Echo Arena, 25 June 2011
- Born: 10 December 1958 (age 67); Paddington, London, England
- Occupation: Singer
- Relatives: Cesár Sampson (nephew)
- Musical career
- Also known as: Pepsi
- Genres: Pop
- Years active: 1981–present
- Labels: Innervision; Epic; Columbia
- Formerly of: Pepsi & Shirlie

Helen DeMacque-Crockett (born 10 December 1958) is a British pop singer, best known as a backing singer for Wham! and a member of the Pepsi & Shirlie duo in the 1980s.

== Early years ==
Helen DeMacque was born in London after her parents emigrated to Britain in the 1950s from Saint Lucia.

== Music career ==
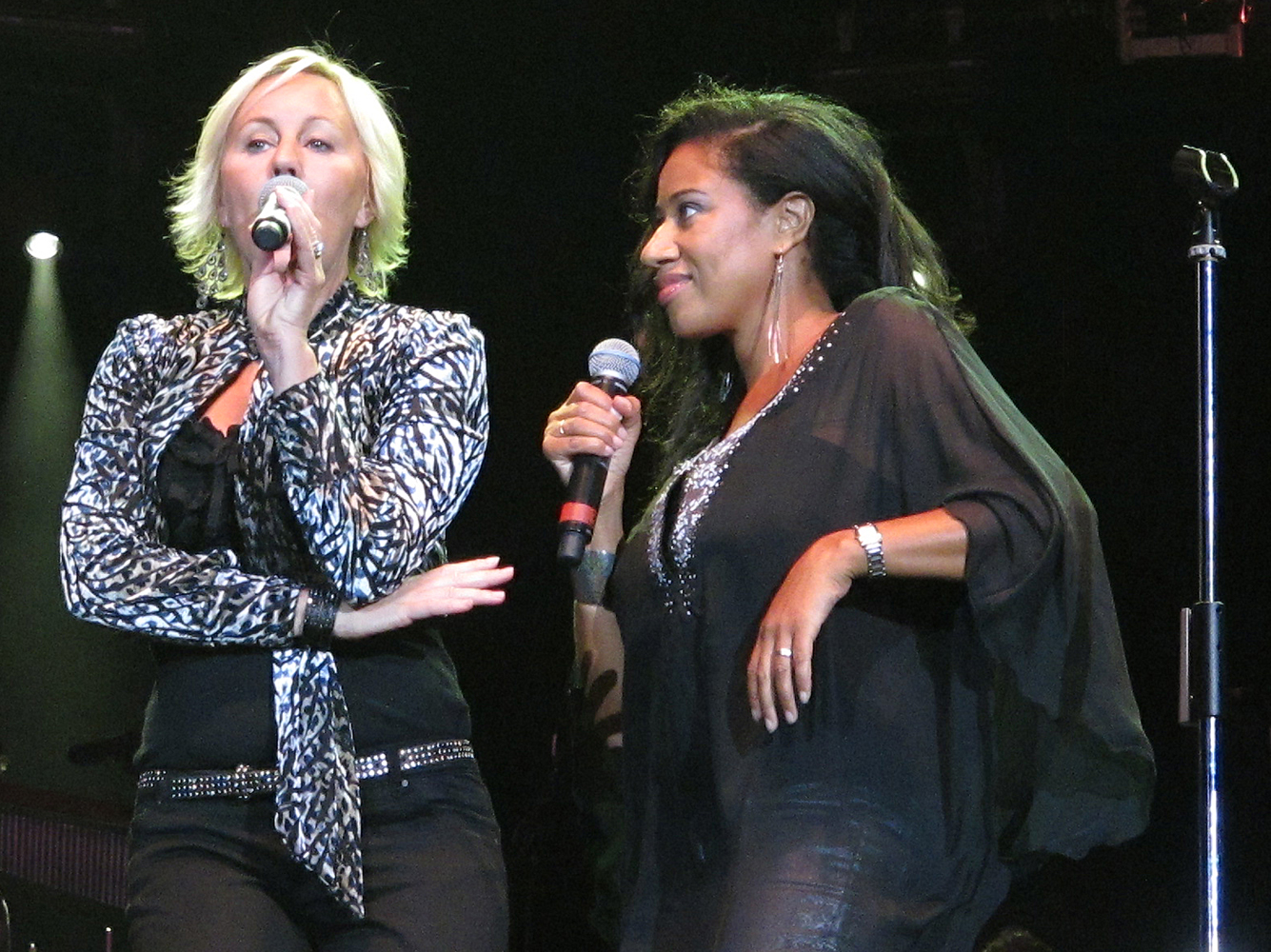
Pepsi and Shirlie at the Liverpool Echo Arena, 2011

DeMacque became one of two singers/dancers for the group Wham! in 1983. She replaced Dee C. Lee, (who left to join The Style Council) and performed alongside Shirlie Holliman, first appearing in the music video for "Wake Me Up Before You Go-Go".

When their work with Wham! ended, Holliman and DeMacque formed their own act, named Pepsi & Shirlie. Created immediately after Wham!'s final Wembley concert, the duo had a more upbeat and pop sound. The group had two UK Top 10 hits: "Heartache", produced by Phil Fearon and Tambi Fernando, reaching No. 2 in the UK Singles Chart, and "Goodbye Stranger", produced by Tambi Fernando and Pete Hammond, which reached No. 9.

Pepsi & Shirlie went on hiatus in 1989, but briefly returned in 2000 to record backing vocals on the UK number one Geri Halliwell hit "Bag It Up". The duo also reunited to perform for the Here and Now 10th Anniversary tour which kicked off on 24 June 2011.

In 1998 and 1999, DeMacque collaborated with Mike Oldfield, participating in his tour Then & Now in 1998 and two events, the premiere of Tubular Bells III in London and the concert Art in Heaven/Millennium Bell for the transition to the year 2000 in Tiergarten in Berlin. She also performed on a song from the album The Millennium Bell.

In 2011, she sang with Forthright, a group of producers and mixers in London.

== Film career ==
DeMacque has also worked as a film and TV actor, including a portrayal of Josephine Baker. As a stage actor, she appeared in James Rado, Gerome Ragni and Galt MacDermot's musical, Hair, at the Old Vic Theatre in London, with Michael Bogdanov directing.

== Personal life ==
DeMacque was domiciled in Wellington, New Zealand, for a number of years, working at a gift shop on Lambton Quay. While in Wellington, she collaborated with New Zealand electronic artist (Jeremy Geor) 50Hz and performed live with composer Rhian Sheehan early on in his career. By 2006, she had settled in Daventry, England, with her former husband Wayne Butcher, working for a medical aid business, until 2010. She later moved to St Lucia, where she and her husband James Crockett operate a charter sailing business.

Her nephew was the 2018 Eurovision Song Contest contestant representing Austria, Cesár Sampson.

In 2021, DeMacque and Shirley Kemp released their joint autobiography, Pepsi & Shirlie: It's All in Black and White, published by Welbeck. The book gives an account of their time touring the world, performing first with Wham! and then in their own right, as a duo.
