= Rosa Cedrón =

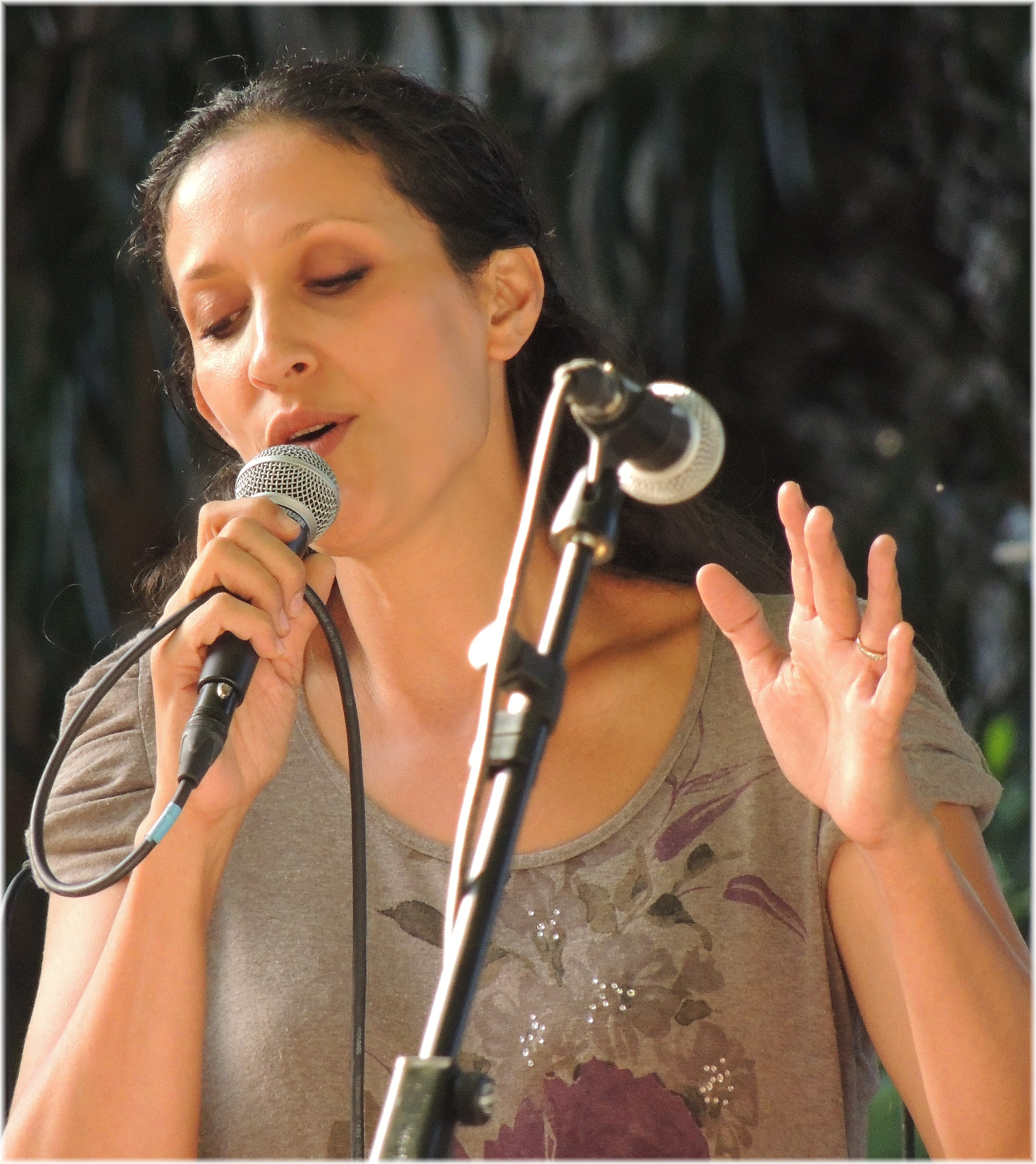

Background information
- Born: 25 October 1972 (age 53); Monforte de Lemos
- Instruments: vocals and cello
- Formerly of: Luar na Lubre
- Website: https://rosacedron.persona.co

Rosa Cedrón (born 25 October 1972 in Monforte de Lemos, Lugo) is a Spanish Galician singer and cello player, known for being the voice for nine years in the group Luar na Lubre, and collaborating on records by musicians such as Mike Oldfield. In 2019, she was the recipient of the Premio Rebulir de la Cultura Gallega in the Galician music category.

== Career ==
From childhood, Cedrón's vocation focused on the cello. She was a member of the Municipal Chamber Orchestra of A Coruña, and later, a music teacher in Ferrol. She was also a teacher of Sabela Ramil, a contestant of the television pop music talent contest Star Academy (Operación Triunfo) 2018, being a finalist in fourth position; Cedrón and Ramil sang "Negro Caravel" at the program's Christmas gala.

== Luar na Lubre (1996-2005) ==
Cedrón began to collaborate with Luar na Lubre, initially as a cellist, but ended up also being a vocalist and with great success, a fact that the musician Mike Oldfield would observe, inviting her to participate in the recording of Tubular Bells III, something that increased Cedrón's popularity and the success of this folk music group. For nine years, Cedrón did extensive work with Luar na Lubre, performing on the best stages, recording several albums, and collecting recognition awards for her music. Meanwhile, she combined her intense career with other projects: recordings with the flamenco music group La Barbería del Sur; the participation in the soundtrack, "Blanca Madison" or "Illegal", put her versatility to the test.

== Solo (2005-) ==
In 2005, Cedrón left Luar na Lubre and thereafter, she dedicated herself to her solo career, publishing her first solo album Entre dous mares in 2007. In 2010, she released a record with Cristina Pato, with Cedrón on the voice and Pato on the piano. In 2013, Cedrón recorded the album Cantando a Galicia with Paco Lodeiro and Sito Sedes, a project that also included a concert tour. In 2016, she published Nada que perder, her second solo album. Recorded at the Casa de Tolos studio, the album Nómade was released in 2021. It was produced by Sergio Moure, and included the musicians Xavier Cedrón and the pianist Miguel Artus.

== Awards and honours ==
- 2019, Premio Rebulir de la Cultura Gallega, Galician music category

== Discography ==
=== Luar na Lubre ===
- 1997: Plenilunio
- 1999: Cabo do Mundo
- 2001: XV Aniversario
- 2002: Espiral
- 2004: Hai un Paraiso

=== Solo ===
- 2007: Entre dous mares
- 2016: Nada que perder
- 2020: Nómade

=== Collaborations ===
- 1998: Tubular Bells III with Mike Oldfield
- 2010: Soas: muller with Cristina Pato
- 2011: Mira hacia el cielo with Enrique Ramil
- 2013: Cantando a Galicia with Paco Lodeiro and Sito Sedes
