= Luar na Lubre =

Celtic folk band from Galicia, Spain

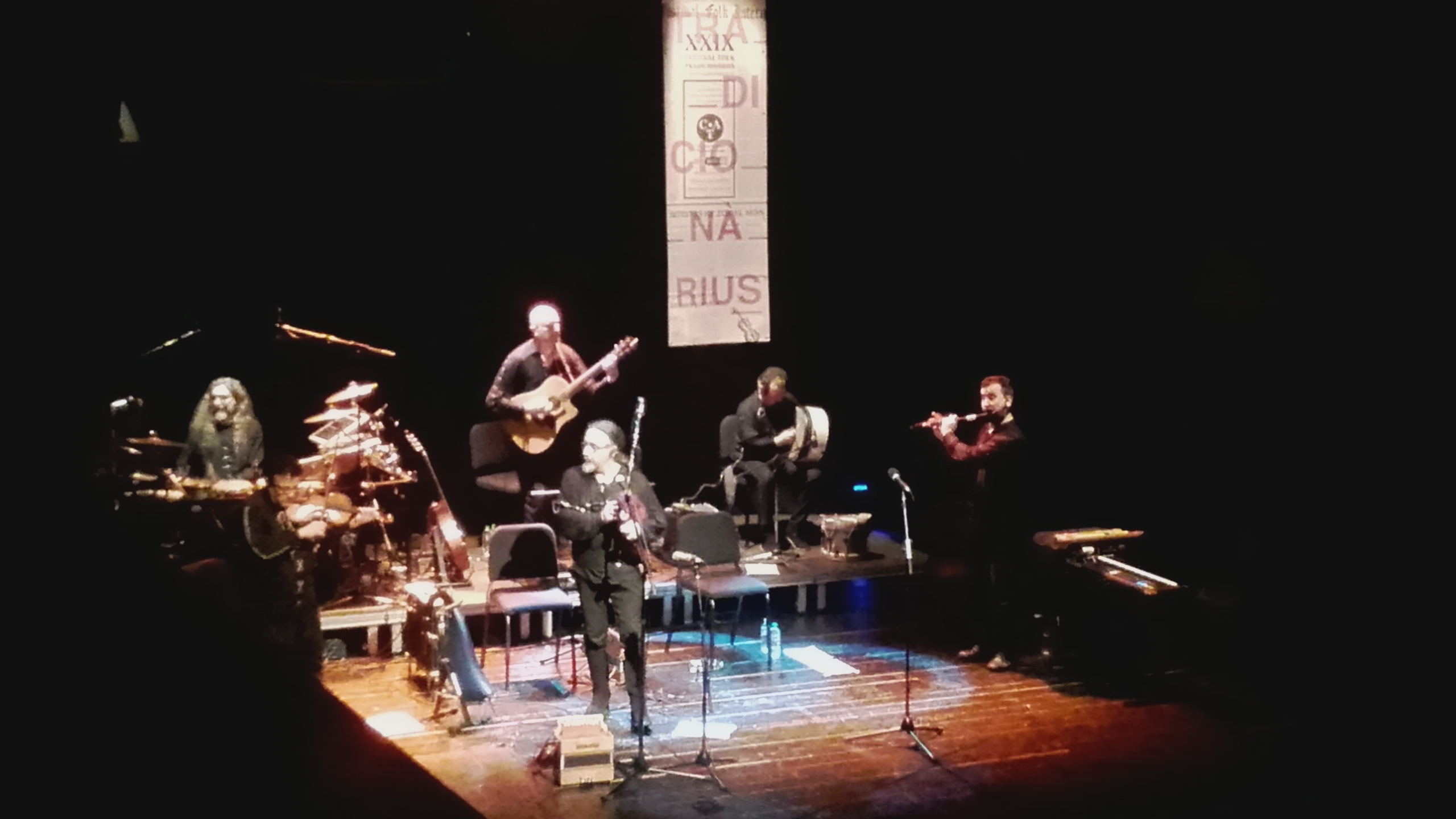
- Luar na Lubre

Background information
- Origin: A Coruña, Galicia, Spain
- Genres: Galician music, Celtic music, folk music
- Years active: 1986–present

Luar na Lubre is a Celtic music ensemble from Galicia, Spain.

== Etymology ==
Luar is Galician for moonlight; lubre is a magical forest in which the Celtic druids cast their spells.

== Performances ==
During its career, this musical group has spread Galician music and culture. The band became famous worldwide after Mike Oldfield took interest in their music. Oldfield fell in love with their song "O son do ar" ("The Sound of the Air", composed by Bieito Romero). Oldfield's cover is on his Voyager album, entitled "Song of the Sun". In 1992 he offered help in their worldwide tour. Their tour together was called Tubular Bells 3. Now it is one of the most famous groups from Galicia. Their first singer Rosa Cedrón is also featured with Mike Oldfield in some songs from his live concert at Horse Guards Parade, near St James's Park, London. Rosa Cedrón left the band in 2005 and Sara Vidal became the new singer. In 2010, the group's leader, Bieito Romero, said the group was "fully fit".

The group recorded a version of "Gerdundula" by Status Quo.

The Spanish folk metal band Mägo de Oz made a cover of Luar na Lubre's song "Memoria da Noite." The Spanish epic metal band Runic made a cover of Luar na Lubre's song "Nau".

Their most famous singles are "Memoria da Noite", "Os Animais", "O son do ar", "Tu gitana" and "Chove en Santiago". Most of their lyrics are in the Galician language. Their song "Nau", written by Bieito Romero is about Galicia as a ship with no direction.

The second part of the song "Downstream" by Shira Kammen (on her album "Music of waters") used "O son do ar". Kammen's cover appears in the video game Braid.

== Members ==
Current members

- Cristina López – Vocals
- Bieito Romero – Bagpipes, accordion and zanfoña
- Nuria Naya - Violin
- Patxi Bermudez – Bodhran, drum and djembe
- Pedro Valero – Acoustic guitar
- Xavier Ferreiro – Latin percussion and effects
- Xan Cerqueiro – Flutes
- Bieito Romero Diéguez – Bagpipes

Former members

- Ana Espinosa – Vocals
- Rosa Cedrón – Vocals (1996–2005)
- Sara Louraço Vidal – Vocals (2005–2011)
- Paula Rey – Vocals (2011-2016)
- Irma Macías – Vocals (-2024)
- Daniel Sisto – Acoustic guitar
- Eduardo Coma – Fiddle
- Xavier Cedron – Fiddle
- Xulio Varela – Bouzouki, horn, tarrañolas and tambourine
- Wafir Gibril – Ud

== Discography ==
- XX Encrucillada (2023)
- Vieiras e Vieiros (2020)
- Ribeira Sacra (2018)
- Extra: Mundi (2015)
- Torre de Breoghán (2014)
- Sons da lubre nas noites de luar (2012)
- Mar Maior (2012)
- Solsticio (2010)
- Ao vivo (2009)
- Camiños da fin da terra (2007)
- Saudade (2005)
- Hai un paraiso (2004)
- Espiral (2002)
- XV aniversario (2001)
- Cabo do mundo (1999)
- Plenilunio (1997, re-issued 2002 with bonus live tracks from 2000)
- Ara Solis (1993)
- Beira atlántica (1990)
- O son do ar (1988)

== See also ==
- Galician traditional music
