= Heartache (song) =

1987 single by Pepsi & Shirlie

Single by Pepsi & Shirlie

from the album All Right Now
- B-side: "Surrender"
- Released: 5 January 1987
- Length: 3:38
- Label: Polydor
- Songwriters: Tambi Fernando; Iris Fernando; Wayne Brown
- Producers: Phil Fearon; Tambi Fernando

Pepsi & Shirlie singles chronology
"Heartache" (1987)	"Goodbye Stranger" (1987)

Audio
- "Heartache" on YouTube

"Heartache" is a song by English pop music duo Pepsi & Shirlie, written by Tambi Fernando, Iris Fernando, and Wayne Brown and produced by Tambi and Phil Fearon. It was released on 5 January 1987 as the lead single from the duo's debut album, All Right Now, which was released that October. Backed with the B-side "Surrender", the single became a chart hit worldwide, peaking at number two on the UK Singles Chart, entering the top 10 in nine other countries, and reaching number 78 on the US Billboard Hot 100. The song's music video was directed by Andy Earl.

== Background and release ==
Pepsi & Shirlie were originally backup singers for English pop music duo Wham!, performing on songs such as "Young Guns (Go for It)". After Wham! split up, Pepsi & Shirlie formed their own group and began recording together. "Heartache" was written by Tambi Fernando, Iris Fernando, and Wayne Brown, while the production was helmed by Tambi and Phil Fearon. It was released as the duo's debut single in the United Kingdom on 5 January 1987, backed with the B-side "Surrender" on the 7-inch vinyl release. Several 12-inch vinyl formats were also issued worldwide, with most including an extended version of "Heartache" mixed by Stock Aitken Waterman and Pete Hammond. A music video was made to promote the single, directed by Andy Earl. The song later appeared as the opening track on Pepsi & Shirlie's debut album, All Right Now, which was released on 26 October 1987.

== Critical reception ==
Jerry Smith of the Music Week magazine described "Heartache" a "weak, lightweight dance track" but deemed that its famous producer and mixers were likely to add some weight. In a review published in Smash Hits, Dave Rimmer considered that "it's clear the girls can actually sing but the song, sadly, is as boring as the title". Retrospectively, in 2021, British magazine Classic Pop ranked "Heartache" number 32 in their list of "Top 40 Stock/Aitken/Waterman songs". In 2025, Thomas Edward of Smooth Radio ranked the song 15th in his list of "Stock Aitken Waterman's 15 greatest songs, ranked" and deemed it a "soulful synth-pop bop".

== Chart performance ==
On 17 January 1987, "Heartache" debuted at number 50 on the UK Singles Chart. Over the next three weeks, the song rose to number 22, jumped to number seven, then peaked at number two on 1 and 8 February 1987. During both weeks, ex-Wham! member George Michael prevented his former backup singers from reaching the top spot with "I Knew You Were Waiting (For Me)". After peaking, the single spent seven weeks within the UK top 75, totalling 12 weeks on the chart altogether; it is Pepsi & Shirlie's highest- and longest-charting UK single. It finished 1987 as the UK's 24th-best-selling hit and was certified silver by the British Phonographic Industry (BPI) for shipping over 250,000 copies. The song was also a top-three success in Ireland, peaking at number three and charting for six weeks.

On the combined Pan-European Hot 100 Singles chart, "Heartache" achieved a peak of number four in its seventh week and remained on the chart for a total of 15 weeks; Music & Media magazine ranking it as Europe's 34th-most-successful song of 1987. It also spent ten weeks on the European Airplay Top 50, including a peak at number six for consecutive three weeks. It peaked at number two in three nations: Belgium, the Netherlands, and Switzerland. In Norway, "Heartache" reached number six for three weeks, while in West Germany, it spent four weeks at number eight. Elsewhere it Europe, the song charted at number 16 in Italy, number 17 in Austria, and number 31 in France. In New Zealand, "Heartache" became a top-10 hit, reaching number nine in July and August 1987, while in Australia, it stalled at number 49 on the Kent Music Report. In the United States, the song peaked at number 78 on the Billboard Hot 100 while its remix reached number two on the Billboard Dance Club Play ranking and number seven on the Billboard 12-inch Singles Sales chart.

== Track listings ==
7-inch single

A. "Heartache" – 3:32
B. "Surrender" – 3:56

UK, Australian, and Japanese 12-inch single

A. "Heartache" (extended remix) – 7:36
B. "Surrender" – 3:56

UK 12-inch single (Dot & Daisy's club remix)

A1. "Heartache" (Dot & Daisy's club remix) – 7:39
B1. "Heartache" (bonus beats) – 5:08
B2. "Surrender" – 3:56

UK and Japanese CDV single

1. "Heartache" (extended remix) – 7:36
2. "Surrender" – 3:57
3. "Heartache" (Dot & Daisy's club remix) – 7:41
4. "Heartache" (video) – 3:52

US 12-inch single

A1. "Heartache" (remix) – 7:40
A2. "Heartache" (bonus beats) – 5:08
B1. "Heartache" (original version) – 7:45
B2. "Heartache" (7-inch edit) – 3:32

Canadian 12-inch single

A1. "Heartache" (club remix) – 7:36
A2. "Heartache" (bonus beats) – 5:08
B1. "Heartache" (extended remix) – 7:35
B2. "Surrender" – 3:56

== Charts ==
=== Weekly charts ===
Weekly chart performance for "Heartache"
Chart (1987)	Peak position
Australia (Kent Music Report)	49
Austria (Ö3 Austria Top 40)	17
Belgium (Ultratop 50 Flanders)	2
Europe (European Hot 100 Singles)	4
Europe (European Airplay Top 50)	6
Finland (Suomen virallinen lista)	2
France (SNEP)	31
Ireland (IRMA)	3
Italy (Germano Ruscitto)	16
Luxembourg (Radio Luxembourg)	2
Netherlands (Dutch Top 40)	2
Netherlands (Single Top 100)	3
New Zealand (Recorded Music NZ)	9
Norway (VG-lista)	6
Switzerland (Schweizer Hitparade)	2
UK Singles (Official Charts)	2
US Billboard Hot 100	78
US Dance Club Songs (Billboard) Remix	2
US Dance Singles Sales (Billboard) Remix	7
West Germany (GfK)	8

=== Year-end charts ===
Year-end chart performance for "Heartache"
Chart (1987)	Position
Belgium (Ultratop 50 Flanders)	19
Europe (European Hot 100 Singles)	34
Netherlands (Dutch Top 40)	30
Netherlands (Single Top 100)	32
Switzerland (Schweizer Hitparade)	17
UK Singles (OCC)	24
West Germany (Media Control)	63

== Certifications ==
Region	Certification	Certified units/sales
United Kingdom (BPI)	Silver	250,000^{^}
^{^} Shipments figures based on certification alone.
