= Sentinel (instrumental) =

"Sentinel (Single Restructure)"

Single by Mike Oldfield

from the album Tubular Bells II
- B-side: "Early Stages"
- Released: 21 September 1992
- Recorded: Los Angeles, Roughwood Croft
- Genre: New-age, progressive rock
- Length: 3:57
- Label: Warner Music UK
- Songwriter: Mike Oldfield
- Producers: Trevor Horn; Mike Oldfield; Tom Newman

Mike Oldfield singles chronology
"Heaven's Open" (1991)	"Sentinel (Single Restructure)" (1992)	"Tattoo" (1992)

"Sentinel" is a song by English musician Mike Oldfield, released in September 1992 by Warner Music UK. The single features a restructured, shorter version of "Sentinel", from Oldfield's fifteenth album, Tubular Bells II (1992). That piece is itself a re-imagining of the introduction theme from Oldfield's 1973 album Tubular Bells which was known for its use in The Exorcist film. "Sentinel" charted at number 10 in the UK Singles Chart and at number 14 in the Irish Singles Chart.

== Usage ==
- An excerpt was used in the soundtrack for the "Back from the Dead" television programme, broadcast by the BBC in 2010 as part of its Horizon series of documentaries
- The piece is featured on a Pavarotti & Friends CD from Luciano Pavarotti's International Charity Gala Concert in Modena on 27 September 1992
- The series Baywatch used the song on its episode "The Tower"

== Track listing ==
- UK single
1. "Sentinel" (Single Restructure) (Mike Oldfield) – 3:57
2. "Sentinel" (the orb 7" mix) – 4:07
3. "Early Stages" – 4:08
- UK promo single
1. "Sentinel-Restructure" (Satoshi Tomiie Interpretation) – 7:41
2. "Sentinel-Restructure" (Global Lust Mix) – 5:55
3. "Sentinel-Restructure" (Trance Mix) – 5:52
4. "Sentinel-Restructure" (Tubular Beats) – 4:12

== Oldfield versus The Orb ==
"Sentinel" was also released as a remix single, credited to Oldfield versus The Orb. It was released on September 28, 1992.

=== "Sentinel Total Overhaul" track listing ===
1. "Sentinel" (nobel prize mix) – 14:26
2. "Sentinel" (orbular bells mix) – 12:26
3. "Sentinel" (the orb 7" mix) – 4:03

== Charts ==
Chart (1992–93)	Peak position
Australia (ARIA)	134
Ireland (Irish Singles Chart)	14
UK Singles (OCC)	10
UK Airplay (Music Week)	32
US Maxi-Singles Sales (Billboard)	36
