= Tubular Bells II =

Studio album by Mike Oldfield
- Released: 31 August 1992
- Recorded: June 1991 – 1992
- Studio: Los Angeles, California and Oldfield's home studio at Roughwood Croft, Chalfont St Giles
- Genre: Progressive rock; new-age
- Length: 58:34
- Label: WEA
- Producer: Trevor Horn; Tom Newman; Mike Oldfield

Mike Oldfield chronology
Heaven's Open (1991)	Tubular Bells II (1992)	The Songs of Distant Earth (1994)

Tubular Bells series chronology
The Orchestral Tubular Bells (1975)	Tubular Bells II (1992)	Tubular Bells III (1998)

Singles from Tubular Bells II
- 1. "Sentinel" Released: 21 September 1992; 2. "Tattoo" Released: 30 November 1992; 3. "The Bell" Released: 5 April 1993

Tubular Bells II is the fifteenth studio album by English guitarist and songwriter Mike Oldfield. It was released on 31 August 1992 by Warner Music UK and is the successor to his debut album Tubular Bells (1973). It was Oldfield's first album for Warner after having worked with Virgin Records for twenty years. Like its predecessor, Tubular Bells II reached number 1 in the UK Albums Chart and spun off a top 10 single, "Sentinel".

== Background ==
In January 1991, Oldfield's contract with Virgin Records expired, ending a partnership that had lasted since 1972 as the first musician signed to the label. Virgin had pressed Oldfield to produce a sequel to his debut album, Tubular Bells (1973), but Oldfield resisted, partly due to his increasing dissatisfaction in Virgin's efforts to promote his albums and his rift with the co-founder, Richard Branson. Oldfield also felt that making a sequel in the 1970s, so soon after its release, would have been "far too obvious" and may lead to creative burnout. Tubular Bells became Oldfield's bestselling album and had continued to sell around 100,000 copies each year.

After releasing Heavens Open (1991), his final album for Virgin, Oldfield felt the time was right to start on a sequel to Tubular Bells. He signed a two-album recording deal with Warner Music UK following negotiations with the chairman, Rob Dickins. Oldfield praised management at Warner for expressing interest in his music and offering constructive suggestions that would help sales without feeling "tied by them", as opposed to Virgin.

== Writing and recording ==
Before Oldfield started to write music for the album, he revisited Tubular Bells and mapped out its composition into different coloured sections. He kept a progress chart in his home studio, writing directly onto the wallpaper in pen; his first entry was in June 1991 when he recorded the first piano figure for the album.

To produce the album, Oldfield chose Trevor Horn with assistance from Tom Newman, who had also helped to produce Tubular Bells. In 2018, Newman said that when Horn was brought into the project, he insisted that the instruments be sequenced rather than played by hand, which led to a major falling-out between Newman and Horn. Horn was based in Los Angeles at this time, so Oldfield rented a mansion off Doheny Drive for nine months to record the album and had his home studio equipment and mixing desk shipped to Los Angeles via the Panama Canal. Oldfield gave Horn the nickname Dr. Click, because of his insistence in having each part played in time. Oldfield credited Horn in giving the album "rhythm and groove" which he considered a weak spot in his technique and something that the original Tubular Bells had lacked. Oldfield also credited Horn in encouraging him to play with "more feeling [and] love", as he had become accustomed to playing in an angry way. "When I did, the music started to sing instead of growling at you."

When it came to recording the tubular bells, Oldfield underwent a search to find a set he deemed satisfactory enough as he had destroyed the original bells used on Tubular Bells. He was close to giving up until he visited a percussion shop in London's East End, where he "Found a little set, almost like a toy set. And I hit them once and said, 'yeah, that's it'".

=== Master of Ceremonies ===
The original Tubular Bells featured a section where Vivian Stanshall was the Master of Ceremonies who calls out instruments being played. For Tubular Bells II, Oldfield and the production team were unsure whether to include a similar part for the sequel and various takes were made, including one of Oldfield doing the part, another featuring Horn in a Scouse accent, a "Disneyland-type voice", and the computer HAL 9000 from 2001: A Space Odyssey (1968). In the end, Oldfield enlisted English actor Alan Rickman to introduce the instruments at the end of "The Bell", which concludes the first half. He was chosen for the "Shakespearean" style of his voice. Rickman's role is credited as "a strolling player", because he had not been chosen to take part when the artwork had been completed. On alternative mixes of "The Bell" released as single B-sides, Billy Connolly and Stanshall each played the Master of Ceremonies. On two alternative language B-sides, German comedian MC Otto and Spanish musician MC Carlos Finaly played the Master of Ceremonies in German and Spanish, respectively.

== Tracks ==
"Early Stages", which is an early version of what would become "Sentinel", was included as a B-side to the single version of "Sentinel". "Early Stages" has a somewhat darker mood and is from the pre-Trevor Horn development of the album, possibly showing the kind of influence that Horn had.

Unlike the original album there is a recurring theme in Tubular Bells II, first appearing at the end of "Sentinel" that reappears throughout the album, though it is most obvious at the end of "The Bell".

Some of the track titles for the album were taken from Arthur C. Clarke's short stories, including "The Sentinel" and "Sunjammer". Other track titles could just be references to science-fiction or space in general, such as "Dark Star" and "Weightless". Dark Star is also the title of a sci-fi film by John Carpenter which was released in the same year as the original Tubular Bells, 1973.

Oldfield has occasionally called some of the tracks on the album by different names in interviews, such as once when he performed "Red Dawn" on BBC Radio 2 he called it "Russian". The title "Russian" was also later given to the equivalent piece on the re-recorded version of the original Tubular Bells, Tubular Bells 2003.

== Artwork ==
Tubular Bells II again uses the bent metallic tube (representing a bent tubular bell) as the focus of the album artwork. The bell is a golden colour on a dark blue background as opposed to Tubular Bells' grey/silver bell on top of a sea/skyscape. Both the photos for Tubular Bells and Tubular Bells II were produced by Trevor Key.

== Release and reception ==
Professional ratings
Review scores
Source	Rating
AllMusic	3/5 stars

The album reached number 1 in the chart in the UK and Spain. Critical reception to the album was mixed. Writing in Q, Mat Snow described it as a "more consistent but less tune-happy musical sequence" than the original Tubular Bells and praised Horn's "fairy dust".

== Live performance ==
The album was supported with a live concert on the esplanade at Edinburgh Castle on 4 September 1992 with 6,000 people in attendance, which aired on national television one hour after its conclusion. It featured Scottish actor John Gordon Sinclair as the Master of Ceremonies. In October 1992, the show was released on home video as Tubular Bells II: The Performance Live at Edinburgh Castle. Oldfield toured the album with his Tubular Bells II 20th Anniversary Tour 1992/93, which visited the US and Europe between March and October 1993.

== Track listing ==
All songs written and composed by Mike Oldfield.

Side one
No.	Title	Length
1.	"Sentinel"	8:07
2.	"Dark Star"	2:16
3.	"Clear Light"	5:48
4.	"Blue Saloon"	2:59
5.	"Sunjammer"	2:32
6.	"Red Dawn"	1:50
7.	"The Bell"	6:59
Total length:		30:31

Side two
No.	Title	Length
8.	"Weightless"	5:43
9.	"The Great Plain"	4:47
10.	"Sunset Door"	2:23
11.	"Tattoo"	4:15
12.	"Altered State"	5:12
13.	"Maya Gold"	4:01
14.	"Moonshine"	1:42
Total length:		28:03

== Personnel ==
- Mike Oldfield – acoustic guitars, twelve-string guitar, banjo, classical guitar, electric guitar, bass guitar, flamenco guitar, glockenspiel, Lowrey organ, Hammond organ, Farfisa organ, mandolin, percussion, piano, synthesisers, timpani, tubular bells, vocals
- Alan Rickman (credited as "A Strolling Player") – Master of Ceremonies
- Sally Bradshaw – vocals
- Celtic Bevy Band – bagpipes
- Eric Caudieux – programming and digital sounds
- Edie Lehmann – vocals
- Susannah Melvoin – vocals
- Jamie Muhoberac – keyboards, special effects
- Steve Payne – bass guitar
- Pipers from the Los Angeles Police Department (credited as P.D. Scots Pipe Band to avoid controversy following the 1992 Los Angeles riots) – bagpipes
- John Robinson – drums on "Altered State"

== Charts ==
=== Weekly charts ===
Weekly chart performance for Tubular Bells II
Chart (1992)	Peak position
Australian Albums (ARIA)	12
Austrian Albums (Ö3 Austria)	4
Dutch Albums (Album Top 100)	15
German Albums (Offizielle Top 100)	7
New Zealand Albums (RMNZ)	27
Spanish Albums (PROMUSICAE)	1
Swedish Albums (Sverigetopplistan)	18
Swiss Albums (Schweizer Hitparade)	19
UK Albums (OCC)	1

Chart (2022)	Peak position
Hungarian Albums (MAHASZ)	38

=== Year-end charts ===
1992 year-end chart performance for Tubular Bells II
Chart (1992)	Position
Dutch Albums (Album Top 100)	100
German Albums (Offizielle Top 100)	94

1993 year-end chart performance for Tubular Bells II
Chart (1993)	Position
Spanish Albums (AFYVE)	16

== Certifications and sales ==
Certifications for Tubular Bells II
Region	Certification	Certified units/sales
Canada	—	30,000
France (SNEP)	Gold	100,000^{*}
Germany (BVMI)	Gold	250,000^{^}
Hong Kong (IFPI Hong Kong)	Platinum	20,000^{*}
Ireland (IRMA)	Platinum	15,000^{^}
Spain (Promusicae)	5× Platinum	500,000^{^}
United Kingdom (BPI)	2× Platinum	600,000^{^}
Summaries
Worldwide	—	2,000,000
^{*} Sales figures based on certification alone.^{^} Shipments figures based on certification alone.
