= Alexia discography =

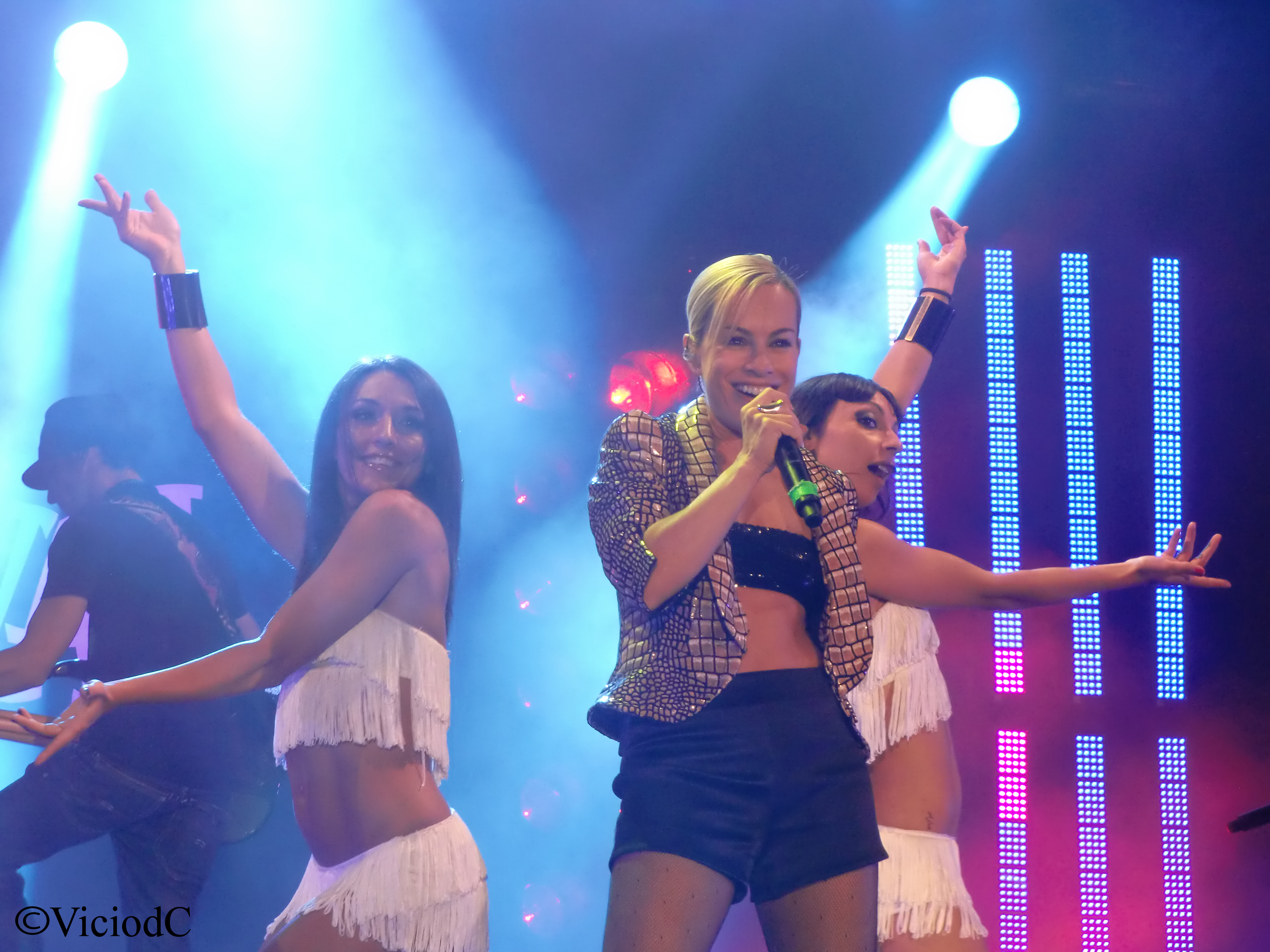
Alexia performance

The following is a selective listing of Italian singer Alexia's discography. She had four number-one singles in Italy.

== Studio albums ==
- Fan Club (1997)
- Remix Album 98 (1998)
- The Party (1998)
- Happy (1999)
- The Hits (2000)
- Mad for Music (2001)
- Alexia (2002)
- Il cuore a modo mio (2003)
- Gli occhi grandi della luna (2004)
- Da grande (2005)
- Le più belle di... Alexia (2007)
- Ale (2008)
- Collections (2009)
- Ale & C (2009)
- Stars (2010)
- iCanzonissime (2013)
- Tu puoi se vuoi (2015)
- Quell'altra (2017)
- My Xmas (2022)

== Singles ==
=== 1990s ===
Year	Single	Peak chart positions											Certifications (sales thresholds)	Album
Year	Single	AUS	AUT	CAN	FIN	FRA	ITA	NED	SPA	SUI	SWE	UK	Certifications (sales thresholds)	Album
1995	"Me and You"	—	—	—	—	—	1	—	1	—	—	—		Fan Club
1996	"Summer Is Crazy"	—	12	—	3	31	1	—	2	25	—	—		Fan Club
1996	"Number One"	—	—	19	2	36	4	—	4	—	—	—		Fan Club
1997	"Uh La La La"	17	6	39	2	13	5	15	1	16	5	10	FRA: Silver; SWE: Gold	Fan Club
1998	"Gimme Love"	—	—	—	6	—	1	—	1	38	37	17		The Party
1998	"The Music I Like"	—	—	—	—	—	1	—	2	—	—	31		The Party
1998	"Keep On Movin'"	—	—	—	—	—	—	—	6	—	—	—		The Party
1999	"Goodbye"	—	—	—	—	—	7	—	—	—	—	—		Happy
1999	"Happy"	—	—	—	—	—	5	—	—	—	—	—		Happy
"—" denotes releases that did not chart

=== 2000s ===
Year	Single	Peak chart positions				Album
Year	Single	AUS	FRA	ITA	SUI	Album
2000	"Ti amo ti amo"	—	—	12	—	The Hits
2000	"Non ti dimenticherò"	—	—	34	—	Come fa bene l'amore
2001	"Money Honey"	—	—	21	85	Mad for Music
2001	"Summerlovers"	—	—	—	—	Mad for Music
2002	"Dimmi come..."	—	—	4	—	Alexia
2002	"Non lasciarmi mai"	—	—	—	—	Alexia
2002	"Don't You Know"	83	70	—	—	Alexia
2003	"Per dire di no"	—	—	11	83	Il cuore a modo mio
2003	"Egoista"	—	—	46	—	Il cuore a modo mio
2004	"Come tu mi vuoi"	—	—	36	—	Gli occhi grandi della luna
2005	"Da grande"	—	—	18	—	Da grande
2009	"Biancaneve"	—	—	6	—	Ale & C.
"—" denotes releases that did not chart

=== Digital singles ===
From 2007 onwards, Alexia began releasing singles as digital downloads only with no physical releases due to the changes in the music industry and the phasing out of CD singles. They are all collected here.

==== Du Du Du ====
"Du Du Du"

Single by Alexia
- Released: 2007
- Length: 3:06
- Label: Sony Music
- Songwriters: Alessia Aquilani & Carlo Gargioni
- Producers: Alessia Aquilani & Carlo Gargioni

Alexia singles chronology
"Mai dire mai" (2005)	"Du Du Du" (2007)	"Grande coraggio" (2008)

Audio video
- "Du du du" on YouTube

"Du Du Du" was a one-off single by Alexia released in 2007 as a digital download. It did not feature on any of Alexia's studio albums and was the last recording of hers to be released by Sony Music, ending a partnership that had gone on since 1996. The song features both English and Italian lyrics. It was released on 13 July 2007, a few months after Alexia gave birth to her daughter.

The title of the track is a vocal hook rather than an Italian phrase, with the song being about Alexia not wanting to lose the feelings she has with her lover, and that tonight is the night it is all going to happen, as she and her lover are going to pretend there are no limits with their sex, with the song making reference to having a child. Notably, this was the first song Alexia released after marrying her husband Andrea Camarana (nephew of Giorgio Armani) and having a daughter, so it is highly likely this influenced the direction of the song.

==== Grande coraggio ====
"Grande coraggio"

Single by Alexia
- Released: 2008
- Length: 4:01
- Label: Edel
- Songwriters: Alessia Aquilani & Umberto Iervolino
- Producers: Alessia Aquilani and Umberto Iervolino

Alexia singles chronology
"Du Du Du" (2007)	"Grande coraggio" (2008)	"Guardarti dentro" (2008)

Audio video
- "Grande coraggio" on YouTube

"Grande coraggio" was the first single release from Alexia's eighth studio album Ale and was presented to Italian Radio on 30 May. As this was the first release from a new album, a CD was issued for release.

The title translates as 'Great Courage' and is about how everyday mistakes are made, and life can be unnerving but that courage does not want us to fail, that it is always there even if you do not realise it, do not yield when things go bad as there is a goal in life that will be achieved.

===== Music video =====
Two videos were filmed for the release which was the first release by Alexia on Edel after leaving Sony Music in 2007, though one was a shorter version of the song intended to promote the forthcoming album. It was the first video clip Alexia had filmed since 2005's Da Grande,

==== Guardarti dentro ====
"Guardarti dentro"

Single by Alexia
- Released: 2008
- Length: 4:02
- Label: Edel
- Songwriters: Alessia Aquilani & Umberto Iervolino
- Producers: Alessia Aquilani & Umberto Iervolino

Alexia singles chronology
"Grande coraggio" (2008)	"Guardarti dentro" (2008)	"Biancaneve" (2009)

Audio video
- "Guardarti dentro" on YouTube

"Guardarti dentro" was the second and final single release from Alexia's eighth studio album Ale and was presented to Italian Radio on 19 September.

As the single was a one track release from an album that was already out (and did not differ from the album version), no separate download or artwork was issued.

The title translates as "To Look At You Inside" with the song being about Alexia's lover not really knowing her as he does not have the courage to look inside himself and thus will suffer torment.

===== Music video =====
The video featured Italian actors Roberto Farnesi, Kledi Kadiu, Primo Reggiani, Rossella Brescia, Giorgia Surina and Roberta Scardola and premiered at the Roma Videoclip Festival.

==== Biancaneve ====
"Biancaneve"

Single by Alexia & Mario Lavezzi
- Released: 2008
- Length: 3:40
- Label: Edel
- Songwriter: Mario Lavezzi
- Producer: Mario Lavezzi

Alexia & Mario Lavezzi singles chronology
"Guardarti dentro" (2008)	"Biancaneve" (2008)	"Come nessuno (Lately)" (2009)

Audio video
- "Biancaneve (feat. Mario Lavezzi)" on YouTube

"Biancaneve" was the first single from Alexia's re-released Ale & C album, released in 2009. It was a duet with Italian singer Mario Lavezzi and the song featured on Lavezzi's album A più voci. The song is about Biancaneve, the Italian name for Snow White and the Seven Dwarves, with 'Bianacaneve' translating as 'Snow White'.

The song alternates between Lavezzi and Alexia with them both singing the chorus and final verse together. In the song, Lavezzi sings how Alexia makes him feel like a prince, whilst Alexia sings about the temptation of the apple, saying she feels she has more in common with the witch. They both sing how neither will regret the paradise they can both offer to each other.

The song was a big hit for the duo, reaching number 1 on the Italian digital chart and number 6 on the combined singles chart. The duo performed the track at the 2009 Sanremo Festival, coming fourth.

==== Come nessuno (Lately) ====
"Come nessuno (Lately)"

Single by Alexia
- Released: 2009
- Length: 2:57
- Label: Global One
- Songwriter: Brian Allen
- Producer: Rob Hoffman

Alexia singles chronology
"Biancaneve" (2009)	"Come nessuno (Lately)" (2009)	"We Is the Power" (2009)

"Come nessuno (Lately)" was the Italian release of the song 'Lately', part of the Global One project releasing the same song simultaneously around the world albeit in local languages. The idea was "Inspired by the idea of uniting artists, languages and cultures around a common theme and five brilliant songs, the Global One project truly promotes the concept of strength through unity, harnessing the power of their collective fan base to rocket its stars onto the global stage. "

The Italian version was recorded and sung by Alexia and Andrea Dianetti, though the latter was not credited on the release. The song was released as a digital download on May 19, 2009. An additional track was available on the download the 'Lately multimix' which featured various versions of the Lately song in its different languages.

===== Music video =====
A video was filmed for the song with each language version dubbed over it. No artist involved appeared in the video. It is the only Alexia single release to have a video that does not feature Alexia.

==== We Is the Power ====
"We Is the Power"

Single by Alexia & Bloom 06
- Released: 2009
- Length: 4:16
- Label: Edel
- Songwriters: Alessia Aquilani, Umberto Iervolino Maury Lobina & Gianfranco Randone
- Producers: Alessia Aquilani, Umberto Iervolino Maury Lobina & Gianfranco Randone

Alexia & Bloom 06 singles chronology
"Come nessuno (Lately)" (2009)	"We Is the Power" (2009)	"E non sai" (2009)

Audio video
- "We Is the Power" on YouTube

"We Is the Power" was the second single release from Alexia's re-released album Ale & C and was released on 12 June. It is a re-recording of the song "Il Branco", which featured on her album Ale. The track was re-recorded in English with additional production from Bloom 06 (previously two thirds of Italian dance act Eiffel 65). Jeffery from Bloom 06 shared lead vocals with Alexia. The two acts had known each other for quite some time as both had previously been involved in Eurodance music.

It was the first Alexia release in English since 2004's "You Need Love". As the single was a one-track release from an album that was already out (and did not differ from the album version), no separate download or artwork was issued.

The track "Il branco" which the song is translated from means 'The Pack' in English. The theme of the English version is along the same lines as the Italian version, in that people have the power to change the world themselves, that boundaries are only limited by yourself. The Italian chorus sings about dreams tattooed on the skin that can not be removed, and the fire to achieve them burns in our eyes whereas the English version sings of holding onto dreams that will burn forever more. The Italian middle8 sings of the pride of being part of 'The Pack' and that 'he wants you' whereas the English middle8 sings of letting go to passion and to be guided by the fire within you. It is assumed that the grammatical error in the English title is deliberate as both artists have released various songs in grammatically correct English in the past.

==== E non sai ====
"E non sai"

Single by Alexia & Madame Sisi
- Released: 2009
- Length: 4:16
- Label: Edel
- Songwriters: Alessia Aquilani, Umberto Iervolino Maury Lobina & Gianfranco Randone
- Producers: Alessia Aquilani, Umberto Iervolino Maury Lobina & Gianfranco Randone

Alexia & Madame Sisi singles chronology
"We Is the Power" (2009)	"E non sai" (2009)

Audio video
- "E non sai" on YouTube

"E non sai" was the third single release from Alexia's re-released album Ale & C and was released on 9 October with the video following on 18 October. It is a re-recording of the song which featured on her album Ale. The track was re-recorded with Italian drag queen singer Madame Sisi (Carlo Tessari).

As the single was a one track release from an album that was already out (and did not differ from the album version), no separate download or artwork was issued.

The title translates as 'And You Do Not Know' with the song being about the love between two people, how it started and ended and how it has changed their lives, though the one person does not know who they are, with the other knowing they have a physical and emotional desire for them, and how now they 'wander between so many people only in search of you'.

===== Music video =====
As with her 2008 single, Guardarti Dentro, the video for E Non Sai was premiered at the Roma Videoclip Festival, with the video featuring actors Anna Foglietta, Arthur Colombini and ballerino Ilir Shaqiri.
