= Le più belle di... Alexia =

Compilation album by Alexia
- Released: 2007
- Genre: Pop
- Label: Sony Music

Alexia chronology
| Da grande (2005) | Le più belle di... Alexia (2007) | Ale (2008) |

Le più belle di... Alexia is the first budget compilation album of the singer Alexia, released in 2006 shortly before she left Sony. It is not regarded as an official Alexia hits compilation as it contains both singles and album tracks. Notably, nearly all of Alexia's physically released Italian singles except "Keep On Movin'", "Money Honey", "Summerlovers" and "Come tu mi vuoi (You Need Love)" are included with the album spanning six of Alexia's seven studio albums (Mad for Music excepted) and two compilation albums with all the new tracks featured on The Hits and Da grande featured. It was released on 22 June 2006 (Sony Code 711246), a few weeks before Alexia's final single with Sony "Du Du Du" which is not included on this release.

== Track listing ==
1. "Me And You" - 4:05
2. "Summer Is Crazy" - 4:20
3. "Number One" - 3:47
4. "Uh La La La" - 3:45
5. "Gimme Love" - 2:57
6. "The Music I Like" - 3:23
7. "Happy" - 3:13
8. "Goodbye" - 3:02
9. "Ti amo ti amo" - 3:08
10. "Dimmi come..." - 3:29
11. "Non lasciarmi mai" - 3:29
12. "Blues" - 4:23
13. "Egoista" - 3:32
14. "Per dire di no" - 3:26
15. "Quello che sento" - 4:37
16. "Funky al cuore" - 3:24
17. "Mai dire mai" - 3:49
18. "Da grande" - 3:42
