= The Hits (Alexia album) =

Compilation album by Alexia
- Released: 2000
- Genre: Europop
- Label: Sony Music
- Producer: Roberto Zanetti

Alexia chronology
Happy (1999)	The Hits (2000)	Mad for Music (2001)

Singles from The Hits
- 1. "Ti amo ti amo" Released: 2000

The Hits is the second compilation album and first greatest hits release by Italian singer Alexia released in 2000 and would be her final album released with Robyx and DWA. The album spans all her international singles from 1995 to 2000, with the sole new song being the lead single "Ti amo ti amo". As they were released in only one territory, the singles "Virtual Reality" and "Hold On" were not included on the album.

In addition to ten single, four album tracks were included "Claro de luna" from The Party and "Baby Baby Baby", "Shake You Up" and "Save a Prayer" from Happy along with three remixes including the Almighty Edit of Uh La La La.

== Release ==
The album was released on CD, cassette and minidisc through Epic, firstly in Italy in June 2000 then throughout Europe (Sony Code 498552).

== Track listing ==
All tracks written & composed by Roberto Zanetti & Alessia Aquilani except as noted.

1. "Ti amo ti amo" - 3:13
2. "Me and You" - 4:05
3. "Summer Is Crazy" - 4:20
4. "Number One" - 3:46
5. "Uh La La La" - 3:44
6. "Gimme Love" - 2:55
7. "The Music I Like" - 3:23
8. "Keep On Movin'" - 3:38
9. "Goodbye" - 3:01
10. "Happy" - 3:13
11. "Baby Baby Baby" - 3:12 (Gianni Bini; Marco Galeotti)
12. "Shake You Up" - 2:36 (Andrea Fascetti; Francesco Alberti)
13. "Save a Prayer" - 3:42
14. "Claro de luna" - 3:55
15. "Uh La La La" (Almighty Edit) - 3:40
16. "Gimme Love" (Club Short Edit) - 3:48
17. "Happy" (2K Noki Short Edit) - 3:10

== Chart performance ==
Country	Position
Italy	26
