= Collections (Alexia album) =

Compilation album by Alexia
- Released: 2009
- Genre: Pop
- Label: Sony Music

Alexia chronology
Ale (2008)	Collections (2009)	Ale & C (2009)

Collections is the second budget compilation album of the singer Alexia released after she left the label. It is not regarded as an official Alexia hits compilation as it contains both singles and album tracks. Notably, the songs are from the time after she left Robyx and DWA and cover the albums Mad for Music, Alexia (Italian version only), Il cuore a modo mio and Gli occhi grandi della luna. "Da grande", one of the new songs from her 2005 hits collection Da grande is included and this is the only Alexia compilation album to feature the single Summerlovers. It was released on 19 February 2009 by Columbia (Sony Code 747217) and was the first and only release by Alexia on Sony's Columbia imprint.

Tracks 1–5, 8 and 12 were previously featured on Sony's first budget Alexia compilation album Le più belle di... Alexia which was notably absent of any tracks from Mad for Music which is represented here with four tracks.

== Track listing ==
1. "Dimmi come..." - 3:29
2. "Egoista" - 3:32
3. "Per dire di no" - 3:26
4. "Da grande" - 3:42
5. "Non lasciarmi mai" - 3:29
6. "L'amore vince" - 3:33
7. "Little Sister" - 4:02
8. "Funky al cuore" - 3:24
9. "The One for Me" - 2:40
10. "In the Name of Love" - 3:35
11. "Summerlovers" - 3:31
12. "Blues" - 4:23
