= Da grande (album) =

Compilation album by Alexia
- Released: 2005
- Genre: Pop
- Label: Sony Music

Alexia chronology
Gli occhi grandi della luna (2004)	Da grande (2005)	Le più belle di... Alexia (2007)

Singles from Da grande
- 1. "Da grande" Released: 2005; 2. "Mai dire mai" Released: 2005 (Radio promo)

Da grande is the third compilation album and second greatest hits release by Italian singer Alexia released in 2005. The album spans all her Italian language singles from 2002 to 2005. Two new tracks were included on the album; "Da grande" and "Mai dire mai" with the former being released as a single and the latter as a radio promo single.

Three album tracks are included; "Un cuore non hai", from her album Il cuore a modo mio, "Quello che sento" and "Funky al cuore", from her album Gli occhi grandi della luna. Both of the latter tracks would be included on both of Sony's budget Alexia compilations Le più belle di... Alexia and Collections.

Three bonus tracks were included; the English versions of "Dimmi come..." ("Don't You Know") and "Come tu mi vuoi" ("You Need Love") along with her 2001 single "Money Honey". Thus, the album could be said to be a compilation of her hits from 2001 to 2005, with the exception of the single "Summerlovers".

== Release ==
The album was released on CD through Epic (Sony Code 519752) and would be the final album of hers to be released by Sony.

== Track listing ==
1. "Da grande" - 3:43 (Alessia Aquilani & Giuseppe Cominotti)
2. "Dimmi come..." - 3:31 (Alessia Aquilani & Massimo Marcolini)
3. "Non lasciarmi mai" - 3:45 (Alessia Aquilani & Massimo Marcolini)
4. "Hasta la vista baby" - 3:47 (Alessia Aquilani & Massimo Marcolini)
5. "Per dire di no" - 3:26 (Alessia Aquilani & Marcello Salerno)
6. "Egoista" - 3:34 (Alessia Aquilani & Marcello Salerno)
7. "Un cuore non hai" - 3:12
8. "Come tu mi vuoi" - 3:58 (Sam Watters)
9. "Una donna sola" - 3:56 (Alessia Aquilani, Francesco Tartarini & Giuseppe Cominotti)
10. "Quello che sento" - 4:27 (Alessia Aquilani; Alfredo Petroli; Francesco Tartarini; Giuseppe Cominotti)
11. "Funky al cuore" - 3:25 (Alessia Aquilani; Alfredo Petroli; Francesco Tartarini; Giuseppe Cominotti)
12. "Mai dire mai" - 3:49 (Alessia Aquilani, Maurizio Fabrizio & Giuseppe Fulcheri)
13. "Don't You Know" - 3:31 (Alessia Aquilani & Massimo Marcolini)
14. "You Need Love" - 3:58 (Sam Watters)
15. "Money Honey" - 3:27 (Alessia Aquilani & Massimo Marcolini)

== Chart performance ==
Country	Position
Italy	58
