= Remix Album 98 =

Remix Album '98

Compilation album by Alexia
- Released: 1998
- Genre: Eurodance
- Label: Polygram
- Producer: Robyx

Alexia chronology
Fan Club (1997)	Remix Album '98 (1998)	The Party (1998)

Remix Album '98 is a compilation album released by the singer Alexia in 1998 in Poland. The album contained remixes of the four official singles from Alexia's debut album Fan Club along with the new track It's Christmas Time (a re-recorded version of Hold On with new lyrics) that had been released on the Christmas edition of Fan Club, two album tracks from Fan Club and a remix of Virtual Reality that was from a single release Alexia was credited to.

== Release ==
The album was released on CD in Poland only on the Polygram label with Alexia's management company DWA not knowing of the release. It is assumed due to the title that it was released in 1998, however from 1998, all of Alexia's releases were through Dancepool, so it may be likely that this was released in late 1997 and named 'Remix Album '98' similar to the way that compilation albums released at the end of the year title themselves to the following year.

== Track listing ==
All tracks written & composed by Roberto Zanetti & Alessia Aquilani except as noted.

1. "Uh La La La" (Beach Mix) - 4:20
2. "Number One" (Club Short Mix) - 3:42
3. "It's Christmas Time" - 3:48 (Alessia Aquilani; Giuseppe Cominotti)
4. "Virtual Reality" (Extended Virtual Mix) - 5:52^{1}
5. "Summer Is Crazy" (Classic Euro Mix) - 6:50
6. "Me And You" (Ice Fran Mix) - 6:10
7. "Uh La La La" (Cellular Mix) - 6:05
8. "Looking for My Baby" (Original Version) - 3:23 (Alessia Aquilani; Andrea Di Antoni; Francesco Alberti)
9. "Number One" (Spanish Euro Mix) - 7:49
10. "Summer Is Crazy" (DADO Flying Mix) - 6:02
11. "Beat of the Night" (Original Version) - 3:48 (Alessia Aquilani; Andrea Di Antoni; Francesco Alberti)
12. "Uh La La La" (Club Mix) - 7:28
13. "Uh La La La" (Fargetta's Mix) - 5:30

^{1} From the E.Y.E. featuring Alexia single "Virtual Reality" which itself is an adaptation of the track "Virtual Reality" from Alexia's album Fan Club
