= Who I Am (Blog 27 song) =

"Who I Am?"

Single by Blog 27

from the album LOL
- Released: November 2006
- Genre: Pop
- Length: 3:09
- Label: Magic Records
- Songwriter(s): Marek Kościkiewicz, Filip Siejka, Do-Jo
- Producer(s): The Professors

Blog 27 singles chronology
"I Still Don't Know Ya" (2006)	"Who I Am?" (2006)	"Cute (I'm Not Cute!)" (2008)

Music video
- "Who I Am?" on Interia

"Who I Am?" is a song performed by Polish band Blog 27 from their 2005 debut album LOL. It was released as the final single from the album in late 2006, and the first single after the departure of one of the lead singers, Ala Boratyn.

== Overview ==
The song is a piano ballad which tells about following one's dreams despite adversities and other people's opinions. Tola has re-recorded the first verse of the song, originally performed by Ala, and released the new solo version as a single at the end of 2006, weeks after Ala's departure from the band. It was Blog 27's fourth international single, and the fifth overall single, following "I Still Don't Know Ya" which was exclusive to Poland. The solo version of "Who I Am?" promoted special edition of LOL which also featured a guitar version of the song.

Contrarily to Blog 27's previous singles, "Who I Am?" was not a commercial success and did not chart although it entered several charts in Poland compiled from the fans' votes.

== Music video ==
The music video was filmed for Tola's solo version. It pictures the singer dressed in a school uniform juxtaposed inside a miniature house. The video premiered in November 2006.

== Track listing ==
- Digital download
1. "Who I Am" (Tola's Version) – 3:09
