= Da grande =

Da grande may refer to:

- Da grande (film), a 1987 Italian comedy film
- Da grande (album), a 2005 compilation album by Alexia
  - "Da grande" (song), the title track from the album

== See also ==
- Da Grande Sports Club
