= Ale (album) =

2008 studio album by Alexia

Studio album by Alexia
- Released: 2008
- Genre: Pop
- Label: Edel
- Producer: Alessia Aquilani; Vittorio Costa; Umberto Iervolino

Alexia chronology
Le più belle di... Alexia (2007)	Ale (2008)	Collections (2009)

Singles from Ale
- 1. "Grande coraggio" Released: 2008; 2. "Guardarti dentro" Released: 2008

Ale is the eighth studio album by Italian singer Alexia released in 2008. The album is the first release on the Edel label after Alexia left Sony Music in 2007 and was the first studio album Alexia had released since 2004's Gli occhi grandi della luna. The album was released in Italy on CD on 27 June 2008 and for digital download the next day. A version which included the song Biancaneve was released in Europe on 24 July 2009.

Two singles were released from the album: "Grande coraggio" which had two videos filmed, one of which contained clips of Alexia in the studio recording the album and at the album photoshoot which was used to promote both album and single; "Guardarti dentro" was the second single and as it was just a one track digital release which did not differ from the album, no separate download track was issued. Initially "Estate" was planned to be the first single from the album.

== Track listing ==
1. "Grande coraggio" – 4:01 (Alessia Aquilani & Carlo Gargioni)
2. "Occhi negli occhi" – 3:40
3. "E non sai" – 3:55 (Alessia Aquilani)
4. "Guardarti dentro" – 4:02 (Alessia Aquilani)
5. "Il branco" – 3:52 (Alessia Aquilani, Carlo Gargioni & Gianfranco Randone)
6. "Estate" – 4:16 (Alessia Aquilani; Massimo Marcolin)
7. "Mio padre" – 4:34 (Alessia Aquilani)
8. "Il folletto" – 4:10 (Alessia Aquilani, Carlo Gargioni & Vittorio Costa)
9. "Ale" – 3:32 (Alessia Aquilani & Carlo Gargioni)
10. "Un attimo nell'infinito" – 4:26 (Alessia Aquilani)
11. "L'immenso" – 4:35 (Alessia Aquilani; Massimo Marcolin)

== Ale & C ==
Ale & C

Studio album by Alexia
- Released: 2009
- Genre: Pop
- Label: Edel
- Producer: Alessia Aquilani, Vittorio Costa & Umberto Iervolino

Alexia chronology
Collections (2009)	Ale & C (2009)	Stars (2010)

Singles from Ale
- 1. "Biancaneve" Released: 2009; 2. "We Is the Power" Released: 2009; 3. "E non sai" Released: 2009

In 2009, Alexia re-released the 'Ale' album with different tracks and recordings under the name Ale & C. Four of the tracks carried through from Ale, most notably the two singles "Grande corraggio" and "Guardarti dentro". Two completely new songs were added; "Biancaneve" which was a duet with Mario Lavezzi and "Il mio mondo" (a cover of the song by Umberto Bindi). The tracks "Il branco" and "Un attimo nell'infinito" were re-recorded in English as "We Is the Power" and "Nowhere" respectively, with "We Is the Power" becoming a duet with Bloom06. "E non sai" was re-recorded as a duet with Madame SiSi and released as a single and "Mio padre" (My Father) was re-recorded with Alexia's sister Annamaria Aquilani. The album was released on February 20, 2009 (a day after the release of Sony's second Alexia budget compilation Collections) and reached number 69 in the Italian charts.

== Track listing ==
1. "Biancaneve" (with Mario Lavezzi) – 3:46 (Mario Lavezzi & Mogol)
2. "We Is the Power" (with Bloom06) – 4:16 (Alessia Aquilani, Carlo Gardioni & Gianfranco Randone)
3. "E non sai" (with Madame SiSi) – 3:55 (Alessia Aquilani)
4. "Guardarti dentro" – 4:02 (Alessia Aquilani)
5. "Grande coraggio"- 4:01 (Alessia Aquilani & Carlo Gargioni)
6. "Mio padre" (with Annamaria Aquilani) – 4:34 (Alessia Aquilani)
7. "Il folletto" – 4:10 (Alessia Aquilani, Carlo Gargioni & Vittorio Costa)
8. "Ale" – 3:32 (Alessia Aquilani & Carlo Gargioni)
9. "Nowhere (L'immenso)" – 4:35 (Alessia Aquilani)
10. "Il mio mondo" – 3:31 (Umberto Bindi)

== Chart performance ==
Country	Position
Italy	69
