= You Need Love =

You Need Love may refer to:

- "You Need Love" (Alexia song)
- "You Need Love" (Hollies song)
- "You Need Love" (Muddy Waters song)
- "You Need Love" (Styx song)

== See also ==
- "You Need Love Like I Do", Tom Jones song
