= Jan Szlagowski =

Polish television and radio presenter, and drummer

- Born: Jan Szymon Szlagowski; November 11, 1984 (age 41); Warsaw, Poland
- Genres: Rock; pop
- Instrument: Drums

Jan Szymon Szlagowski (born November 11, 1984, in Warsaw) is a television and radio presenter, as well as a drummer, known for his involvement in the music group Blog 27, where his younger sister Tola was the vocalist.

== Biography ==
Jan Szymon Szlagowski was born and raised in Warsaw as the son of Katarzyna Dorota (née Krupicz) and musician Jarosław Szlagowski. He has a younger half-sister, Tola who is the vocalist for the music group Blog 27.

In the years 2003–2004, Szlagowski was a presenter on the youth magazine show Rower Błażeja on TVP1. He has also hosted programs on MTV, TVN Style, and 4fun.tv, as well as in radio.

In the years 2006–2008, Szlagowski served as the drummer for Blog 27 alongside his younger sister Tola Szlagowska, who was the main vocalist. He portrayed the character Filip, a member of the B27 band and colleague of Patryk, in the TVN series 39 and a Half (2008–2009). In October 2011, he participated in recording the album KaCeZet & Fundamenty with the Kacezet band.

Jan was also the narrator for the documentary film "Nowy Sudan" (2011). In Patryk Vega's film Hans Kloss. Stawka większa niż śmierć (2012), he appeared as a radio speaker for Radio Moscow. In the musical film Polskie gówno (2014), he was a member of the Lucy Fur band.

In 2017, he moved to Dharamsala in northern India, where he studied the Tibetan language. From there, between 2020 and 2022, he hosted the podcast "Duchowy materializm" on the Radiospacja platform.
