= Cute (I'm Not Cute!) =

2008 single by Blog 27

Single by Blog 27

from the album Before I'll Die...
- Released: 10 March 2008
- Genre: Pop-punk
- Length: 3:09
- Label: Magic Records
- Songwriter(s): Tola Szlagowska
- Producer(s): Agnieszka Burcan, Paweł Radziszewski, Tola Szlagowska

Blog 27 singles chronology
"Who I Am?" (2006)	"Cute (I'm Not Cute!)" (2008)	"Fuck U!" (2008)

Music video
- "Cute (I'm Not Cute!)" on YouTube

"Cute (I'm Not Cute!)" is a song performed by Polish band Blog 27 from their 2008 album Before I'll Die....

== Overview ==
The song was written by the band's leader Tola Szlagowska who also co-produced it with Agnieszka Burcan and Paweł Radziszewski of the Polish band Plastic. It had its radio premiere on 10 March 2008 and was released as a digital download single in Poland only. The song and its music video received a four-star review from the American music magazine Blender.

== Music video ==
The song's music video was filmed in March and released on 10 April 2008. It was directed by Anna Maliszewska.

== Track listing ==
- Digital download
1. "Cute (I'm Not Cute!)" – 3:09
