= Come tu mi vuoi =

Come tu mi vuoi (Italian for 'The way you want me') may refer to:

- Come tu mi vuoi (film), a 2007 Italian comedy film
- "Come tu mi vuoi" (song), a 2004 song by Alexia
- Come tu mi vuoi (play), a 1930 play by Luigi Pirandello
