= Blog 27 =

Polish musical group

- Origin: Warsaw, Poland
- Genres: Pop, teen pop, pop punk, pop rock
- Years active: 2005–2008
- Labels: Universal, Kontor
- Past members: Tola Szlagowska; Ala Boratyn; Jan Szlagowski; Adam Milwiw-Baron; Aleksander Milwiw-Baron; Paweł Rosiak; Maria Foryś; Sylwia Dymek

Blog 27 was a Polish musical group founded in 2005 by two teenage vocalists Tola Szlagowska and Ala Boratyn performing pop music with elements of pop punk and pop rock. The duo's debut album, LOL (2005), was certified double platinum in Poland and also achieved moderate success in Western Europe and Japan. It included three internationally charting singles: "Uh La La La", "Hey Boy (Get Your Ass Up)" and "Wid Out Ya". After Ala's departure in 2006, the act released one more album, Before I'll Die... (2008), but shortly after that Tola relocated to Los Angeles to pursue a degree in music, and the band has since been inactive. Blog 27 has sold over 250,000 records worldwide and is regarded as the forerunner of the emo fashion in Poland.

== Career ==
Blog 27 was founded by two teenage singers and friends, Tola Szlagowska and Alicja "Ala" Boratyn. The group's name came from their interest in blogging and shared birth date (both girls were born on 27 November 1992). They debuted with a cover of Alexia's "Uh La La La" in the summer of 2005, which achieved success in Poland. It was followed by another cover version, the song "Hey Boy (Get Your Ass Up)", originally performed by Swedish group Teddybears, which also was a hit in the band's home country. Their debut album, LOL, was released on the girls' 13th birthday in November 2005 and was met with commercial success, ultimately peaking at no. 2 in Polish albums chart and receiving double platinum certification. The album was released internationally in 2006 and charted in a number of countries across Europe, and in Japan. "Uh La La La", "Hey Boy (Get Your Ass Up)" as well as the third single, "Wid Out Ya", gained moderate chart success in German-speaking countries and Italy. Blog 27 went on tour supporting the hugely popular German group Tokio Hotel across Germany, Austria and Switzerland.

In October 2006, Ala announced that she is leaving Blog 27, citing personal and creative differences between Tola and her, and released a solo album Higher in the next year. Following her departure, Tola recruited four musicians (including her brother, Jan) and two dancers to the band. In November, Blog 27 won the award for Best Polish Act at the 2006 MTV Europe Music Awards. Tola recorded new vocals for the ballad "Who I Am?" and released it as the next single. She also appeared solo in the accompanying music video. In 2007, Blog 27 received European Border Breakers Award which recognizes emerging acts successful also outside their home countries.

The band's second and final studio album, Before I'll Die..., was released in April 2008. Tola wrote and composed all songs, and some of them were used in the popular Polish TV series 39 i pół in which the band appeared. The lead single, "Cute (I'm Not Cute!)", became a hit in Poland and received a four-star review from Blender. The album was only released in Poland where it reached no. 3 in charts and was certified gold. Later in 2008, Tola moved to Los Angeles where she went on to study at Alexander Hamilton High School and Los Angeles College of Music. Blog 27 subsequently ceased activity, although both Ala and Tola have continued their respective solo careers.

== Band members ==
- Tola Szlagowska (vocalist, 2005–2008)
- Alicja "Ala" Boratyn (vocalist, 2005–2006)
- Jan Szlagowski (drummer, 2006–2008)
- Adam Milwiw-Baron (keyboardist, 2006–2008)
- Aleksander "Alek" Milwiw-Baron (guitarist, 2006–2008)
- Paweł "Justin" Rosiak (bassist, 2006–2008)
- Maria Foryś (dancer, 2006–2008)
- Sylwia Dymek (dancer, 2006–2008)

== Discography ==
=== Studio albums ===
Year	Title	Chart positions							Certifications
Year	Title	POL	AUT	EUR	GER	HUN	JAP	SWI	Certifications
2005	LOL	2	47	49	27	12	64	78	POL: 2 × Platinum
2008	Before I'll Die...	3	—	90	—	—	—	—	POL: Gold
"—" denotes a recording that did not chart or was not released in that territory.

=== Singles ===
Year	Title	Chart positions					Album
Year	Title	AUT	CZE	GER	ITA	SWI	Album
2005	"Uh La La La"	23	—	17	36	36	LOL
2005	"Hey Boy (Get Your Ass Up)"	24	37	26	—	96	LOL
2006	"Wid Out Ya"	56	—	88	—	—	LOL
2006	"I Still Don't Know Ya"	—	—	—	—	—	LOL
2006	"Who I Am?"	—	—	—	—	—	LOL
2008	"Cute (I'm Not Cute!)"	—	—	—	—	—	Before I'll Die...
2008	"Fuck U!"	—	—	—	—	—	Before I'll Die...
"—" denotes a recording that did not chart or was not released in that territory.
