= Rower Błażeja =

- Country of origin: Poland

Production
- Producer: Jaroslaw Grzelak
- Production location: TVP's studio in Warsaw
- Running time: 30 minutes

Original release
- Network: TVP
- Release: 1997 – 2004

Rower Błażeja (eng. Błażej's Bike) was a live Polish youth show broadcast on TVP from 1997 until June 2004, Monday through Friday. It was the first young adult show in post-communist Poland. The show featured discussions with invited guests and celebrities on topics related to contemporary youth. It also included live band performances, sports, culture and other serial blocks as well as Internet chat with the audience.

== Presenters ==
The hosts of the program were young journalists, often still attending high school.

- Paulina Chylewska (1997–2001)
- Marcin Kolodynski (1997–2001)
- Michal Paciorkowski (1997–2000)
- Cyprian Ziabski (1997–2002)
- Katarzyna Dydo (1997–2002)
- Katarzyna Dukaczewska (1997–2002)
- Tomasz Nastaj (1999–2000)
- Dorota Szelagowska (1997–2002)
- Emilia Sobczynska-Ziabska (1999–2002)
- Maciej Samborski (1999–2002)
- Monika Mroziewicz (2002–2004)
- Jedrzej Mackowski (2002–2004)
- Justyna Dzbik (2003–2004)
- Jan Szlagowski (2003–2004)
- Monika Krysiak (2003–2004)
- Ivo Widlak (1997–2000)

== Controversies ==
- The program often stirred controversies due to its liberated approach to sex and contraception.
