= Before I'll Die... =

Studio album by Blog 27
- Released: 18 April 2008
- Recorded: 2007–2008
- Genre: Pop punk, electropop
- Length: 79:24
- Label: Magic Records
- Producer: Agnieszka Burcan, Paweł Radziszewski, Tola Szlagowska

Blog 27 chronology
LOL (2005)	Before I'll Die... (2008)

Before I'll Die... is the second and final studio album by Polish band Blog 27, released in 2008 by Magic Records, a subsidiary of Universal Music.

== Album information ==
All songs on the album were written and co-produced by the singer and co-founder of the band, Tola Szlagowska. Following Ala Boratyn's departure from the band in 2006, Tola was now the only lead singer on the album. The material was recorded in various studios in Warsaw, but mixed in Hollywood, California. Tola had the album's title tattooed on her wrist shortly before its release, even though it contains a grammatical error (it should have been Before I Die). The incorrect title was heavily criticised on celebrity gossip websites, and eventually an ironic warning in Polish was added on the album's cover, which read: "Parental Advisory. Contains grammatical and orthographical errors :)".

"Cute (I'm Not Cute)" preceded the album as the lead single. Its music video received a four-star review from the American music magazine Blender. The second and final single was "Fuck U!", accompanied by a video filmed in Los Angeles. A number of songs from the album was featured in the popular Polish TV series 39 i pół in which the band appeared as B27 and Tola played the part of a character named Ola.

Contrarily to the band's debut album, Before I'll Die... did not receive international release. In Poland, it did not sell as well as LOL, but still managed to reached no. 3 in the chart and was eventually certified gold. Several months after the release of the album, Tola relocated to Los Angeles to pursue a degree in music and as a result, Blog 27 ceased activity.

== Track listing ==
1. "Cute (I'm Not Cute)" – 3:08
2. "That Lady" – 2:34
3. "Cry and Die!" – 3:49
4. "Finally (Outta' Ma Life!)" – 3:21
5. "Fuck U!" – 3:19
6. "Do U Care?!" – 3:16
7. "2 Fast 2 Live" – 2:59
8. "Nothing's Gonna Change..." – 4:25
9. "Whoever Whatever" – 3:18
10. "Feel It, Shout It!" – 3:30
11. "Tell Me Y" – 3:08
12. "Where's Ma Place?" – 3:30

+ all songs in instrumental karaoke versions

== Chart positions ==
=== Weekly charts ===
Chart (2008)	Peak position
Polish Albums (OLiS)	3
European Top 100 Albums	90

=== Year-end charts ===
Chart (2008)	Peak position
Poland	47

== Certifications ==
Region	Certification	Certified units/sales
Poland (ZPAV)	Gold	15,000^{*}
^{*} Sales figures based on certification alone.
