= LOL (Blog 27 album) =

Studio album by Blog 27
- Released: 27 November 2005
- Recorded: 2005–2006
- Genre: Pop
- Label: Magic Records, Kontor Records, Avex Group
- Producer: The Professors, Random, Plastic

Blog 27 chronology
LOL (2005)	Before I'll Die... (2008)

LOL (stylised <LOL>) is the debut studio album by Polish pop group Blog 27, released in Poland in 2005 and internationally in 2006.

== Release ==
The album was originally released in Poland on Ala and Tola's 13th birthday on 27 November 2005. The first edition included only 10 tracks and 2 music videos. The second edition, released in spring 2006, included two new songs plus instrumental karaoke version of all 12 tracks. This edition also had the outro in "I'm Callin' U" edited out and sported a slightly different cover. The Japanese version released later that year used an entirely different cover picture. On 27 November 2006, the album was re-released again, replacing the original version of "Who I Am?" with Tola's solo re-recording and adding a guitar version of the song. It came with a DVD containing music videos, making-of material, concert footage, an interview, and more.

== Track listing ==
=== First edition (2005) ===
1. "Hey Boy (Get Your Ass Up)" – 3:23
2. "Uh La La La" – 3:13
3. "I Want What I Want" – 3:04
4. "Turn You On to Music" – 2:45
5. "Stay Outta My Way" – 3:20
6. "Destiny" – 2:58
7. "Wid Out Ya" – 3:03
8. "Life Like This" – 2:45
9. "I'm Callin' U" – 3:30
10. "Who I Am?" – 3:09

Music videos:

1. "Hey Boy (Get Your Ass Up)"
2. "Uh La La La"

=== International edition (2006) ===
1. "Hey Boy (Get Your Ass Up)" – 3:23
2. "Uh La La La" – 3:13
3. "I Want What I Want" – 3:04
4. "Wid Out Ya" – 3:03
5. "I Still Don't Know Ya" – 3:45
6. "Destiny" – 2:58
7. "Turn You On to Music" – 2:45
8. "Stay Outta My Way" – 3:20
9. "Life Like This" – 2:45
10. "I'm Callin' U" – 3:02
11. "Generation (B27)" – 3:17
12. "Who I Am?" – 3:09

+ all songs in instrumental karaoke versions

=== CD+DVD edition (2006) ===
CD

1. "Hey Boy (Get Your Ass Up)" – 3:23
2. "Uh La La La" – 3:13
3. "I Want What I Want" – 3:04
4. "Wid Out Ya" – 3:03
5. "I Still Don't Know Ya" – 3:45
6. "Destiny" – 2:58
7. "Turn You On to Music" – 2:45
8. "Stay Outta My Way" – 3:20
9. "Life Like This" – 2:45
10. "I'm Callin' U" – 3:02
11. "Generation (B27)" – 3:17
12. "Who I Am?" (Tola's Version) – 3:09
13. "Who I Am?" (Tola's Guitar Version) – 3:09

+ all songs in instrumental karaoke versions

DVD

1. Migawki / Schnappschüsse
2. Teledyski / Videoclips
3. Bravo TV Show
4. Wywiad z zespołem / Interview mit der Band
5. Koncert z Hamburga / Das Konzert in Hamburg
6. Making of the Videos
7. Video z dzieciństwa Toli / Aus Tolas Kindheit
8. Video z podpisywania płyt / Autogrammstunde

== Charts ==
=== Weekly charts ===
Chart (2006)	Peak position
Austrian Albums (Ö3 Austria)	47
German Albums (GfK Entertainment Charts)	27
European Top 100 Albums	49
Hungarian Albums (Mahasz)	12
Japanese Albums (Oricon)	64
Polish Albums (OLiS)	2
Swiss Albums (Schweizer Hitparade)	78

=== Year-end charts ===
Chart (2006)	Peak position
Poland	18

== Certifications ==
Region	Certification	Certified units/sales
Poland (ZPAV)	2× Platinum	60,000^{*}
^{*} Sales figures based on certification alone.
