= Ala Boratyn =

Polish singer-songwriter

- Born: Alicja Julia Boratyn; 27 November 1992 (age 33); Łódź, Poland
- Genres: Pop rock
- Occupation: Singer-songwriter
- Years active: 2005–present
- Label: QL

Alicja Julia "Ala" Boratyn (Polish pronunciation: [ˈala bɔːˈratɨn]), born 27 November 1992), sometimes known as just Ala, is a Polish singer-songwriter. She rose to fame in 2005 as one of the lead singers of Polish girl duo Blog 27. With Blog 27, Boratyn enjoyed success in her native Poland, Central Europe, and Japan. Having departed from the band in 2006, she embarked on a short-lived solo career before becoming member of the bands Wicked Giant, New People and Ala Zastary.

== Career ==
Boratyn debuted in 2005 as a member of the Polish band Blog 27 which she founded with a childhood friend Tola Szlagowska. The duo achieved commercial success with their debut album LOL which in 2006 charted in several European countries and Japan. It was certified double platinum in Poland and included three moderate international hits: "Uh La La La", "Hey Boy (Get Your Ass Up)" and "Wid Out Ya". As part of Blog 27, Ala toured in Western Europe supporting the popular German band Tokio Hotel.

In October 2006, Ala announced her departure from the band, citing personal and creative differences between Tola and her. She subsequently launched solo career, releasing the debut album Higher in November 2007. Although the first single, "Angel", was met with considerable success, the album failed to match the commercial success of Blog 27's album. She then recorded five songs for the soundtrack of the 2010 TV series Majka, the Polish version of the popular Venezuelan telenovela Juana la virgen. Two of those songs, "Nie pytaj mnie" and "SMS", became hits. The former won an award as the best digitally selling Polish song of 2011 – Digital Song of the Year.

In 2014, after several years of hiatus, she became the vocalist of the band Wicked Giant which performed grunge-inspired pop music. The band released a self-titled EP in 2016. She has also started performing in an indie pop band New People, and in late 2017, launched the project Ala Zastary with her New People bandmate Jakub Sikora. The duo released the debut single "Pilot" in late 2017. In February 2018, New People's acclaimed self-titled debut album was released. Ala Zastary released their debut album Jutro? in 2020.

== Discography ==
- 2005: LOL (with Blog 27)
- 2007: Higher (solo)
- 2016: Wicked Giant (EP; with Wicked Giant)
- 2018: New People (with New People)
- 2020: Jutro? (with Ala Zastary)
