= Higher (Ala Boratyn album) =

Studio album by Ala
- Released: November 12, 2007
- Recorded: March and August 2007
- Genre: Pop rock
- Length: 48:52
- Label: QL Music
- Producer: Leszek Kamiński, Marcin Gajko

Higher is a studio album by Polish singer Ala Boratyn, released in 2007 under the mononym Ala.

== Overview ==
It was Ala's debut solo release after the departure from Blog 27 in October 2006, and remains her only full-length solo album to date. The material consists of pop rock material with elements of electronica, ska and reggae. Ala co-wrote most songs herself and collaborated with musicians from Polish rock bands T.Love and Hey. The original title of "I Never Know" was "You Don't Know", "Darling" was earlier known as "Big Chance", and "Strange New Feeling" is a re-worked version of "Ska". "Angel" was chosen as the first single at the end of 2007, followed by "Don't Believe Them" and "The Shadow Lands" in 2008. "Angel" enjoyed moderate popularity in the media, but the album was not a commercial success and did not enter Polish weekly albums chart.

== Track listing ==
1. "Angel" – 3:29
2. "Don't Believe Them" – 3:41
3. "Darling" – 4:12
4. "A La La Song" – 3:02
5. "Losing My Head" – 3:57
6. "The Shadow Lands" – 3:32
7. "I Never Know" – 3:20
8. "Higher" – 4:12
9. "I Don't Like You" – 4:25
10. "Strange New Feeling" – 3:55
11. "We're Going Nowhere" – 4:09
12. "Porque te vas" (Acoustic Version) – 3:32
13. "Angel" (Acoustic Version) – 3:27
14. "I Don't Like You" (Acoustic Version) – 4:29
