= The Party (Alexia album) =

Studio album by Alexia
- Released: 1998
- Genre: Eurodance
- Label: Sony Music
- Producer: Robyx

Alexia chronology
Remix Album 98 (1998)	The Party (1998)	Happy (1999)

Singles from The Party
- 1. "Uh La La La" Released: 1998 (UK & Australia only); 2. "Gimme Love" Released: 1999; 3. "The Music I Like" Released: 1998; 4. "Keep On Movin'" Released: 1998

The Party is the second studio album by Italian singer Alexia released in 1998. The album saw Alexia begin to branch away from the eurodance sound of Fan Club towards Europop, causing disappointment amongst some of Alexia's fans. The album contained the Almighty Edit of "Uh La La La" as a bonus track for territories which had seen the release of Fan Club, and the lead track for the UK and Australia where the song had been released in its remixed version.

"The Party" refers to the album's opening track "Keep On Movin'" in which Alexia is credited for hosting a good party. The album sold 500,000 copies worldwide.

== Release ==
The album was released on CD through Sony Dancepool, firstly in Italy then throughout Europe (Sony Code 491339). The German edition featured the original version of "Uh La La La" as the lead track rather than containing the remixed version. An alternate European release (Sony Code 491542) saw "Dame Amor" (the Spanish version of "Gimme Love") replaced in favour of the Club Short Edit of "Gimme Love". The UK release followed in June 1998 featuring slightly different artwork followed in July by the Australian release.

In 1999, the Japanese version was released on the Sony Epic label with both "The Party" and "Uh La La La" on the cover. The artwork is nearly identical to the American single release of "Uh La La La".

The majority of the tracks were written by Alexia and Robyx, though four of the tracks were written by others such as Andrea Fascetti ("If You Say Goodbye"), Fascetti and Federico Zanetti ("Feelings"), Alexia, Andrea de Antoni and Francesco Alberti ("Everything") and Alexia, de Antoni, Alberti and Sandra Chambers ("Bad Boy").

== Track listing ==
1. "Keep On Movin'" - 3:38
2. "Gimme Love" - 2:55
3. "Bad Boy" - 3:28
4. "The Music I Like" - 3:23
5. "Crazy For You" - 3:57
6. "Claro de luna" - 3:55
7. "Everything" - 3:34
8. "Feelings" - 4:25
9. "Everyday" - 3:46
10. "I Love My Boy" - 3:15
11. "Don't Love Me Baby" - 2:45
12. "If You Say Goodbye" - 3:34
13. "Dame amor" - 2:55
14. "Uh La La La" (Almighty Edit) - 3:40

The UK release substituted the original versions of "Gimme Love" and "The Music I Like" for their UK counterpart remixes by Pump Friction Vs. Precious Paul ("Gimme Love") and Metro ("The Music I Like") with them leading the album after the Almighty Edit of "Uh La La La". The Pump Friction Vs. Precious Paul Edit of "Gimme Love" was a minute longer than the Edit used for UK radio. The Australian release followed the same track listing with the Club Mix of "Number One" being added as a bonus track.

The Japanese version followed the same track listing as the UK version (though the Pump Friction Vs. Precious Paul Edit was just labelled as "Gimme Love") with five additional alternate versions in the following order;

15. "The Music I Like" (Radio Edit) - 3:24
16. "The Music I Like" (Radiopm Project In Ibiza) - 4:04
17. "Uh La La La" (U.S. Radio Edit) - 3:44
18. "Uh La La La" (Fargetta's Mix) - 5:25
19. "Uh La La La" (Almighty's Mighty Mix) - 6:25

== Chart performance ==
Chart performance for The Party
Chart (1998)	Peak position
Finnish Albums (Suomen virallinen lista)	9
Italian Albums (Musica e Dischi)	17
UK Albums (Official Charts)	97

== Certifications ==
Region	Certification	Certified units/sales
Finland (Musiikkituottajat)	Gold	27,634
