= Ivo Widlak =

American journalist

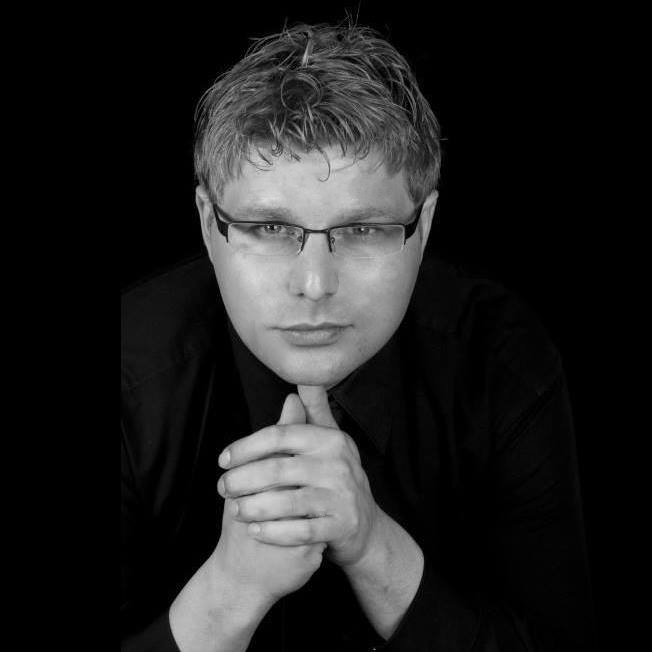
- Born: July 5, 1978; Knurów, Poland
- Died: May 28, 2020 (aged 41); Chicago, IL, United States
- Occupations: Journalist, Talk show host, Television presenter
- Years active: 1990–2020
- Website: www.ivowidlak.com

Ivo Widlak (born Sławomir Widłak 5 July 1978 - 28 May 2020) was an international press, radio and TV journalist. He started as a very young reporter at weekly newspaper in his hometown titled "Przegląd Lokalny". Then he started hosting TV show for children and teenagers called "Kleks" on TVP Katowice. The same year, in 1995, wrote scripts and hosted "5-10-15", another show for children and teenagers on TVP1 on Telewizja Polska. Later he co-developed and co-hosted "Twój Problem Nasza Głowa" on Telewizja Wisła later TVN (Poland). In 1998 he moved to Warsaw to co-host "Rower Błażeja" on TVP1 on Telewizja Polska. During his career he worked for Radio Puls in Gliwice and Radio ZET in Warsaw. In 2001 he moved permanently to Chicago, and in 2004 he created and hosted own talk show, titled "Ivo na zywo", and produced and hosted daily news program on TVPChicago broadcast on Channel 34 WJYS. He also has been an editor-in-chief of several popular internet news websites in Polish. He rose to prominence as an investigative journalist in the United States, for uncovering corruption and irregularities that took place with the renovation of the building of the Polish Consulate General, Chicago titled "Consulgate" (the Supreme Chamber of Control of the Republic of Poland informed by Widlak later confirmed that irregularities occurred at all stages of implementation of the renovation, and the final cost was in the amount of $8.2 million). President of the Polish Cultural Institute in Chicago.

== Deportation controversy ==
On December 14, 2012, pinknews.co.uk reported that Ivo Widlak is facing the risk of deportation from the United States due to his bisexuality. Widlak has been married for ten years to a woman, Lale. However, someone in the local Polish community, later revealed it was attorney Christopher Kurczaba, reportedly went to authorities and claimed that Ivo and Lale were in a sham marriage, and that Ivo was in fact homosexual.

The Widlaks are not a same-sex couple, so they do not fall under the protection of a recent executive order that President Obama signed in September 2012. That order stated that foreigners in a same-sex relationship with an American citizen have the same anti-deportation protections as foreigners married to an American citizen.
