= Non ti dimenticherò =

2000 single by Alexia and Gianni Morandi

Single by Alexia, Gianni Morandi

from the album Come fa bene l'amore
- Released: 2000
- Genre: Pop
- Length: 4:16
- Label: BMC
- Songwriters: Alessia Aquilani, Cogliarti, Tosetto, Ramazzotti
- Producer: Roberto Zanetti

Alexia, Gianni Morandi singles chronology
"Ti amo ti amo" (2000)	"Non ti dimenticherò" (2000)	"Money Honey" (2001)

"Non ti dimenticherò" is a duet released by the Italian singers Gianni Morandi and Alexia released in November 2000. It was the first release by Alexia since leaving Robyx and the DWA team, and the first song she recorded in Italian.

The title translates as 'I Will Not Forget' and the song begins with Morandi singing the first verse and chorus in Italian followed by Alexia singing in English. The pair then sing together in English before finishing in Italian. The song opened Alexia up to new audiences and would form the basis of the next part of her career when she began recording in Italian in 2002. The song was included on Morandi's album Come fa bene l'amore but due to licensing, would not appear on any Alexia album.

== Release ==
The track was released in Italy in November 2000 on digipak CD. Two versions of the song were released with the CD containing two previous Morandi tracks; "Canzone libera" and "Voleva farti innamorare". The CD references that Alexia appears courtesy of Sony Music.

== Official versions ==
- Radio Version 4:16
- Album Version 4:53

== Charts ==
Chart (2000)	Peak position
Italy (FIMI)	34
