= Wid Out Ya =

Single by Blog 27

from the album LOL
- Released: 24 April 2006 (Poland); 23 June 2006 (Germany)
- Recorded: 2005
- Genre: Pop rock
- Length: 3:03
- Label: Kontor
- Songwriter(s): Marek Kościkiewicz, Filip Siejka, Do-Jo
- Producer(s): The Professors

Blog 27 singles chronology
"Hey Boy (Get Your Ass Up)" (2005)	"Wid Out Ya" (2006)	"I Still Don't Know Ya" (2006)

Music video
- "Wid Out Ya" on Interia

"Wid Out Ya" is a song performed by Polish band Blog 27 from their 2005 debut album LOL. It was released as the third single from the album in 2006.

The song could not chart in Blog 27's home country where there was no official singles sales chart at that time, but it was popular there and did enter a number of radio and magazines charts based on the fans' votes. It also entered official singles charts in Austria and Germany.

== Music video ==
The music video begins with Ala and Tola walking down an empty car park, accompanied by a group of girls. They approach and confront a group of boys, singing the song at them. The scene is interspersed with live footage from Blog 27's concert in Hamburg, Germany on 8 March 2006. The car park scenes were filmed in April and the final video premiered in May 2006.

== Track listing ==
- CD maxi single
1. "Wid Out Ya" (New Edit) – 3:03
2. "Wid Out Ya" (Extended Version) – 4:17
3. "Wid Out Ya" (Karaoke Version) – 3:01

+ "Wid Out Ya" (The Video)

- Digital download
1. "Wid Out Ya" (New Edit) – 3:03
2. "Wid Out Ya" (Extended Version) – 4:17
3. "Wid Out Ya" (Karaoke Version) – 3:01

== Chart performance ==
Chart (2006)	Peak position
Austria (Ö3 Austria Top 40)	56
Germany (GfK Entertainment Charts)	88
