= Fourteen 14 =

Italian Eurodance project

- Origin: Italy
- Genres: Eurodance
- Years active: 1994–2000
- Labels: M.V.S.
- Past members: Sabrina Perugini; Alessia Aquilani

Fourteen 14 (sometimes styled as Fourteen Fourteen) was an Italian Eurodance project fronted by former DJ and vocalist Sabrina Perugini. The project was named after her lucky number, 14. The project was produced by Claudio Mingardi, Gianluca Vivaldi, and Riccardo Salani.

Sabrina Perugini began her career in the music industry as a professional DJ. At 18, after DJing at clubs throughout Italy, she met producer Claudio Mingardi, who has worked with Roberto Zanetti, better known as Robyx. Roberto has worked with other projects, like Ice MC, Corona, and Double You. Alessia Aquilani, better known as Alexia, was the real vocalist on Fourteen 14's first two singles, "Don't Leave Me" and "Goodbye".

== Discography ==
There were no albums released for Fourteen 14. She released a total of eight singles. Her first two singles, "Don't Leave Me" and "Goodbye" performed well in several European countries, especially Italy, and it even made a spot on the charts in Brazil. Her cover of "Everytime We Touch" was released before Cascada's famous cover, but Cascada's version ended up taking the fame. "Goodbye" is based on the Savage song of the same name, and borrows lyrics from another one of their songs, which was "Ten Years Ago".

=== Singles ===
1994

"Don't Leave Me"

1995

"Goodbye"

1996

"Another Crack In My Heart"

"Heart's Dreams" (B-Side)

1997

"Everytime We Touch"

1998

"All I Have To Do Is Dream"

1999

"A Night In Paradise"

2000

"Down Down"

=== As featured artist ===
1998

"Do You Wanna Try?" (with Prince Charming)
