= Tola Szlagowska =

Polish singer-songwriter (born 1992)

Tola
- Born: Tola Klara Szlagowska; 27 November 1992 (age 33); Warsaw, Poland
- Genres: Pop
- Occupation: Singer-songwriter
- Years active: 2005–present
- Labels: Humans on Earth, Warner Music Poland
- Formerly of: Blog 27

Tola (born Tola Klara Szlagowska on 27 November 1992) is a Polish singer-songwriter. She rose to fame in 2005 as one of the lead singers of Polish girl duo Blog 27 which enjoyed success in Poland, Central Europe, and Japan. She has continued her solo career since 2011.

== Career ==
In 2005, she founded a music duo Blog 27 with her friend Ala Boratyn. The group released two studio albums, LOL (2005) and Before I'll Die... (2008), which spawned hit singles "Uh La La La", "Hey Boy (Get Your Ass Up)", "Wid Out Ya", and "Cute (I'm Not Cute!)". In 2008, Szlagowska appeared in a popular Polish TV series 39 i pół which also featured the band's songs. Despite international success, Blog 27 ceased activity the same year when Tola moved to Los Angeles to study at Alexander Hamilton High School and Los Angeles College of Music.

Between 2011 and 2012, she released a series of solo singles mononymously as Tola, including "Muse" and "Let It Go", which met with positive feedback. "Muse" was one of the contenders to represent Poland in the 2011 OGAE Video Contest. In 2017, she previewed some of the new material live in Poland and collaborated with American DJ Smiles Davis who sampled her song "Morning Blues". Tola returned in 2018 with the single "Atmosphere", distributed by Warner Music Poland, which met with positive reception. Her first solo album, Subtitles, was released independently by her label Humans on Earth in February 2021, promoted by a new single, "Recycled/Fragile".

== Private life ==
Tola's father, Jarosław Szlagowski, performed as a percussionist with such Polish rock bands as Lady Pank and Maanam, and her mother, Żaneta, worked for the Polish subsidiary of Universal Music Group. She has described her spiritual views as equally inspired by Christianity and Buddhism. She has spoken out in favour of same-sex marriage and criticized the 2008 California Proposition 8.

== Discography ==
=== Albums ===
Title	Details
Subtitles	Release date: 26 February 2021; Label: Humans on Earth; Formats: CD, digital download, streaming

=== Singles ===
Title	Year	Album
"Don't Go"	2011	–
"Muse"	2011	Subtitles
"Everything Personal"	2011	–
"Let It Go"	2011	–
"Agrafka"	2012	–
"Rzeczywistość"	2012	–
"Unnecessary"	2012	–
"Atmosphere"	2018	Subtitles
"Recycled/Fragile"	2021	Subtitles
"First Love"	2021	Subtitles
