= Sanremo Music Festival 2003 =

Italian song contest (53rd edition)

Dates and venue
- Semi-final 1: 4 March 2003
- Semi-final 2: 5 March 2003
- Semi-final 3: 6 March 2003
- Semi-final 4: 7 March 2003
- Final: 8 March 2003
- Venue: Teatro Ariston; Sanremo, Italy

Organisation
- Broadcaster: Radiotelevisione italiana (RAI)
- Musical director: Pippo Caruso
- Artistic director: Pippo Baudo
- Presenters: Pippo Baudo and Serena Autieri, Claudia Gerini

Big Artists section
- Number of entries: 20
- Winner: "Per dire di no" Alexia

Newcomers' section
- Number of entries: 16
- Winner: "Siamo tutti là fuori" Dolcenera

The Sanremo Music Festival 2003 (Italian: Festival di Sanremo 2003), officially the 53rd Italian Song Festival (53º Festival della canzone italiana), was the 53rd annual Sanremo Music Festival, held at the Teatro Ariston in Sanremo between 5 and 9 March 2003 and broadcast by Radiotelevisione italiana (RAI). The show was presented by Pippo Baudo (who also served as the artistic director of the festival), assisted by Serena Autieri and Claudia Gerini.

The winner of the Big Artists section was Alexia with the song "Per dire di no", while Sergio Cammariere won the Critics Award with the song "Tutto quello che un uomo". Dolcenera won the Newcomers" section with the song "Siamo tutti là fuori".

In addition to musical guests, the guests of this edition also included Sharon Stone, Mike Bongiorno (eleven-time host of the festival), Valentino Rossi, Mario Cipollini, Enrico Montesano, Nino Frassica, Giorgio Panariello, Lino Banfi, Massimo Ghini. Nilla Pizzi received a career award and performed her hits "Grazie dei fiori" and "Vola colomba", with which she won the first two editions of the festival (1951 and 1952).

== Participants and results ==
=== Big Artists ===
Big Artists section
Song	Artist(s)	Songwriter(s)	Rank	Notes
"Per dire di no"	Alexia	Alberto Salerno; Alexia	1	Winner of the "Big Artists" section
"7000 caffè"	Alex Britti	Alex Britti	2	
"Tutto quello che un uomo"	Sergio Cammariere	Roberto Kunstler; Sergio Cammariere	3	Mia Martini Critics Award; Volare Award for Best Music
"Nessuno tocchi Caino"	Enrico Ruggeri & Andrea Mirò	Enrico Ruggeri; Andrea Mirò	4	Volare Award for Best Lyrics
"L'amore è"	Syria	Jovanotti	5	
"Oceano"	Lisa	Mauro Malavasi; Leo Zandri; Andrea Sandri	6	
"Morirò d'amore"	Giuni Russo	Giuni Russo; Maria Antonietta Sisini; Vania Magelli	7	Volare Award for Best Arrangement
"Nel cuore delle donne"	Silvia Salemi	Giampiero Artegiani; Silvia Salemi	8	
"Di un amore"	Antonella Ruggiero	Antonella Ruggiero; Antonio Volpe	9	
"Fortuna"	Luca Barbarossa	Luca Barbarossa	10	
"'A storia 'e nisciuno"	Nino D'Angelo	Nino D'Angelo; Nuccio Tortora	11	
"Un giorno nuovo"	Cristiano De André	Cristiano De Andrè; Oliviero Malaspina; Massimo Talamo; Stefano Melone; Daniele Fossati	12	
"Eri tu"	Fausto Leali	Fausto Leali; Gatto Panceri	13	
"Cambierò"	Anna Oxa	Marco Falagiani; Marco Carnesecchi; Anna Oxa	14	
"Quelli che non hanno età"	Eiffel 65	Gabriele Ponte; Maurizio Lobina; Gianfranco Randone; Domenico Capuano; Gregory Colla	15	
"Non si cresce mai"	Bobby Solo & Little Tony	Giancarlo Bigazzi; Bobby Solo; Gianni Gastaldo	16	
"Volere volare"	Anna Tatangelo & Federico Stragà	Bungaro; Claudio Passavanti	17	
"Tonight"	Negrita	Fabrizio Barbacci; Paolo Bruni; Franco Li Causi; Cesare Petricich; Enrico Salvi	18	
"Sarà una canzone"	Amedeo Minghi	Amedeo Minghi	19	
"Fossi un tango"	Iva Zanicchi	Loriana Lana; Aldo Donati	20	

=== Newcomers ===
Newcomers section
Song	Artist(s)	Songwriter(s)	Rank	Notes
"Siamo tutti là fuori"	Dolcenera	Dolcenera	1	Winner of the Newcomers' section; Winner of the Press, Radio & TV Award – Newcomers' section
"Un piccolo amore"	Alina	Antonello de Sanctis; A. Bettini; M. Telli; Alberto Cheli	2	
"Lei che"	Zurawski	Andrea Zurawski; Vince Tempera; M. Martellini	3	
"Chi sei non lo so"	Verdiana	V. Centrone; E. Giudizi; Max Minoia	4	
"Bastava un niente"	Gianni Fiorellino	Antonio Casaburi; Gianni Fiorellino	5	
"Chiaraluna"	Daniele Stefani	Giuliano Boursier; Daniele Stefani	6	
"Lividi e fiori"	Patrizia Laquidara	Giuseppe Romanelli; Patrizia Laquidara; Antonio Calò	7	Winner of the Mia Martini Critics Award – Newcomers' section
"Valeria"	Elsa Lila	Luca Bechelli; Gianluca Mattei; Marco Marati	8	
"Cento cose"	Roberto Giglio	Roberto Giglio	9	
"Vicina e lontana"	Jacqueline M. Ferry	Jacqueline Maiello Ferry; Jean Marie Maiello Ferry	10	
"Vorrei"	Daniela Pedali	Depsa; Angelo Valsiglio; Luca Valsiglio; S. Monetti	11	
"Amami"	Manuela Zanier	Manuela Zanier; Paolo De Lazzaro; R. Russo	12	
"Chiama di notte"	Allunati	Enrico Nascimbeni; Alex Lunati	13	
"E già"	Marco Fasano	Marco Fasano; Antonio Annona	14	
"Tre fragole"	Maria Pia & SuperZoo	Gianni Colonna; Francesco Roccia	15	
"Mi sento libero"	Filippo Merola	Filippo Merola; Raffaele Di Pietro	16	

== Musical guests ==
Guests
Artist(s)	Song(s)
Peter Gabriel	"Growing Up"
Shania Twain	"I'm Gonna Getcha Good!"
Rod Stewart	"These Foolish Things"
Des'ree	"It's Okay"
Juventus Football Club players	"Il mio canto libero"
Carla Bruni	"Quelqu'un m'a dit"
Panjabi MC	"Mundian To Bach Ke"
Blue	"One Love"
Shaggy	"Strength Of A Woman"
Diana Krall	"Fly Me to the Moon"
Holly Valance	"Down Boy"

== Broadcasts ==
=== International broadcast ===
Known details on the broadcasts in each country, including the specific broadcasting stations and commentators are shown in the tables below.

International broadcasters of the Sanremo Music Festival 2003
Country	Broadcaster	Channel(s)	Commentator(s)	Ref(s)
Hungary	MTV	mtv (Note: Delayed broadcast on 29 March at 23:10 (CEST))		
