= Milano Pride =

Annual LGBT event in Milan, Italy

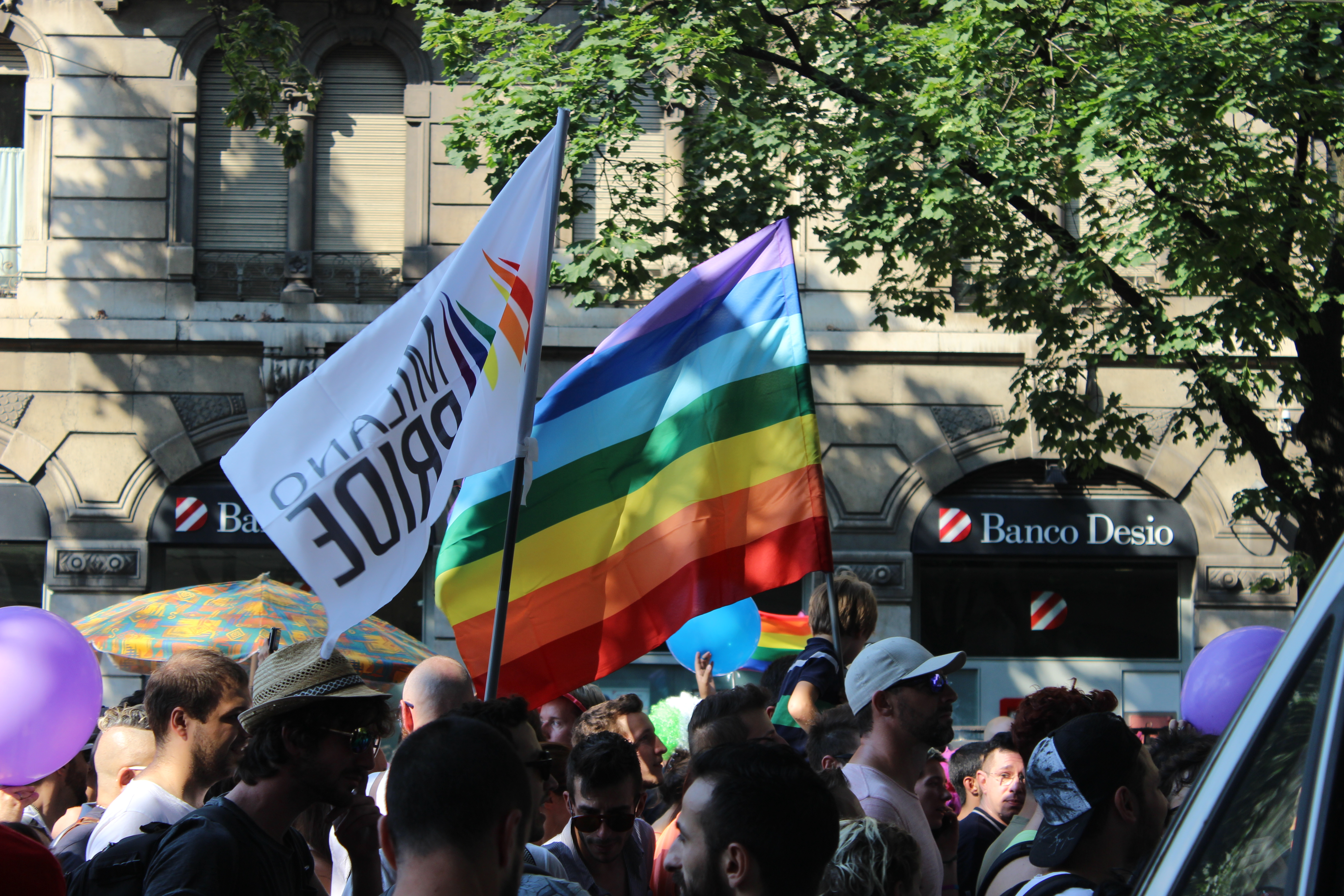
Flags of Milano Pride

The Milano Pride is a parade held at the end of June each year in Milan, Italy, to celebrate the lesbian, gay, bisexual, transgender, asexual, intersexual and queer (LGBTQ+) people and their allies. Until 2012, the event has been held each year but with a different name. Milano Pride is one of the largest gay and lesbian organized events in Italy. Its aim is to demonstrate for equal rights and equal treatment for LGBTQ people, as well as celebrate the pride in Gay and Lesbian Culture.

== History ==
The pride in Milan is held every year but with different names each year. Since 2013 Pride in Milan is organized by a group named "Milano Pride", whose members come from the main LGBTQ rights organizations in Milan. The team organizes the entire pride parade and Pride Week.

In 2018, the event attracted an estimate of 250,000 people.

The event was cancelled in 2020 due to the COVID-19 pandemic, but the event returned in person in 2021. In 2022, an estimate of 300,000 people marched in the Milano Pride parade.

== Pride Week ==
Since 2013, every year at the end of June and during the week when Pride parade is organized, Pride Week takes place in the city. During that week, many cultural events such as debate, video shooting, book presentations, take place mainly in Casa dei Diritti (House of Rights), a building in which the city of Milan hosts services for citizens linked to discriminations and human rights.

Near Porta Venezia, which is the most attended district by LGBTQ people, "Pride Square" takes place: many vendors sell food, drinks, and items, and music is played in the street.

== See also ==
- LGBTQ rights in Italy
- Milan
