= Hold On (Alexia song) =

Single by Alexia

from the album Fan Club
- Released: 1997 (Brazil)
- Genre: Pop
- Length: 3:46
- Label: Spotlight Records
- Songwriter(s): Giuseppe Cominotti & Alessia Aquilani
- Producer(s): Giuseppe Cominotti

Alexia singles chronology
"Virtual Reality" (1997)	"Hold On" (1997)	"Gimme Love" (1998)

Audio video
- "Hold On" on YouTube

"Hold On" is a single released by the Italian singer Alexia solely in Brazil in 1997. It was the only single released during Alexia's time with DWA that was not written by Alexia and Robyx. It was released on CD only by Spotlight in 1997 with a commission of remixes. Alexia's management team at DWA (who had been releasing and licensing all of Alexia's music) did not know about the release of this single, though they have now released the track on some online stores.

The CD included the song "It's Christmas Time" which is actually "Hold On" with different lyrics. "It's Christmas Time" was later featured on the Limited edition Christmas version of Fan Club. It was one of the songs of the Brazilian soap opera Por Amor.

== Official versions ==
- Album Version 3:46
- Meme Radio Hit 5:23
- Meme Extended Clubmix 7:10
- Meme Extended Clubmix Instrumental 7:09
- Live Version 3:54
