= Ti amo ti amo =

Single by Alexia

from the album The Hits
- Released: 2000
- Genre: Europop
- Length: 3:13
- Label: Sony Music
- Songwriter(s): Roberto Zanetti
- Producer(s): Roberto Zanetti

Alexia singles chronology
| "Happy" (1999) | "Ti amo ti amo" (2000) | "Non ti dimenticherò" (2000) |

Audio video
- "Ti Amo Ti Amo" on YouTube

"Ti amo ti amo" is the tenth single released by the Italian singer Alexia released in 2000 and was the only new track from her first best of compilation album The Hits. It was the last single she released that was produced by Robyx as she decided to leave the DWA team so that she could grow as an artist and pursue different styles of music.

When the single was announced, there was some confusion in that it was initially thought the single was "Te amo", a track from Alexia's then current album Happy which had been a fan favourite. Fan opinion on the single was divided, with some fans labelling it "unacceptable".

== Music video ==
The video for the single was filmed in America.

== Release ==
The track was released in Italy on CD and 12" (Sony Code 669426) in May 2000. Remixes were done solely by Robyx and this would be the last Alexia release he would do remixes for. A promotional CD was released in Brazil.

== Official versions ==
- Radio Version 3:13
- Original Long Version 5:58
- Club Short Edit 3:02
- Club Extended Version 5:52

== Charts ==
=== Weekly charts ===
| Chart (2000) | Peak position |
|---|---|
| Italy (FIMI) | 12 |
| Italy Airplay (Music & Media) | 1 |
