= The Music I Like =

Single by Alexia

from the album The Party
- Released: 1998
- Genre: Eurodance
- Length: 3:23
- Label: Sony Music
- Songwriters: Roberto Zanetti & Alessia Aquilani
- Producer: Roberto Zanetti

Alexia singles chronology
"Gimme Love" (1999)	"The Music I Like" (1998)	"Keep On Movin'" (1998)

Audio video
- "The Music I Like" on YouTube

"The Music I Like" is a song by Italian singer Alexia, released in 1998 as the second single from her second album, The Party (1998). It is her sixth single overall and reached number one in Italy. A complete set of remixes for the UK market were issued which were later released in Italy.

== Release ==
The track was initially released in Italy on a maxi-CD, a two-track CD and a 12-inch vinyl before being released across mainland Europe. The UK lead remix of Alexia's previous single "Gimme Love" was a bonus track on the CD and 12-inch release. A limited edition 12-inch doublepack was released, the second disc containing some of the unreleased UK remixes of "Gimme Love".

A set of remixes were commissioned for the UK market, with the Metro Club Edit being placed on the UK version of The Party instead of the original. The Metro edit was also dubbed onto the video, yet despite this the video with the original version was rotated in the UK as well, with the original radio version being released as the lead UK radio edit. An additional set of remixes were made for the UK market by Trouser Enthusiasts and Almighty (who had done the UK version of "Uh La La La", with the Almighty mix having a soundalike sample from Stardust's "Music Sounds Better with You". The remix was dubbed "Alexia Vs Stardust – Music Sounds Better with Alexia".

Following the UK release, a remix release was issued in Italy on both CD and 12-inch containing the new UK remixes along with a slower version entitled the 'US Radio Mix' even though the track was never released in America. The Australian release contained a mixture of original and UK remixes. The standard Italian release was released digitally in 2006 and a further set of remixes (mainly those commissioned for the UK market) were released in 2015 including two dub remixes by Metro and Trouser Enthusiasts that were never released on commercial or promotional copies.

== Music video ==
A music video was produced to promote the single. The video was edited to both the original version in the UK and the Metro Club edit.

== Charts ==
Weekly chart performance for " The Music I Like"
Chart (1998)	Peak position
Canada Dance (RPM)	4
Europe (Eurochart Hot 100)	47
Italy (FIMI)	5
Italy Airplay (Music & Media)	9
Scottish Singles Sales (Official Charts)	26
Spain Maxi-Singles (AFYVE)	2
UK Singles (Official Charts)	31
