= Alexia (singer) =

Italian singer (born 1967)

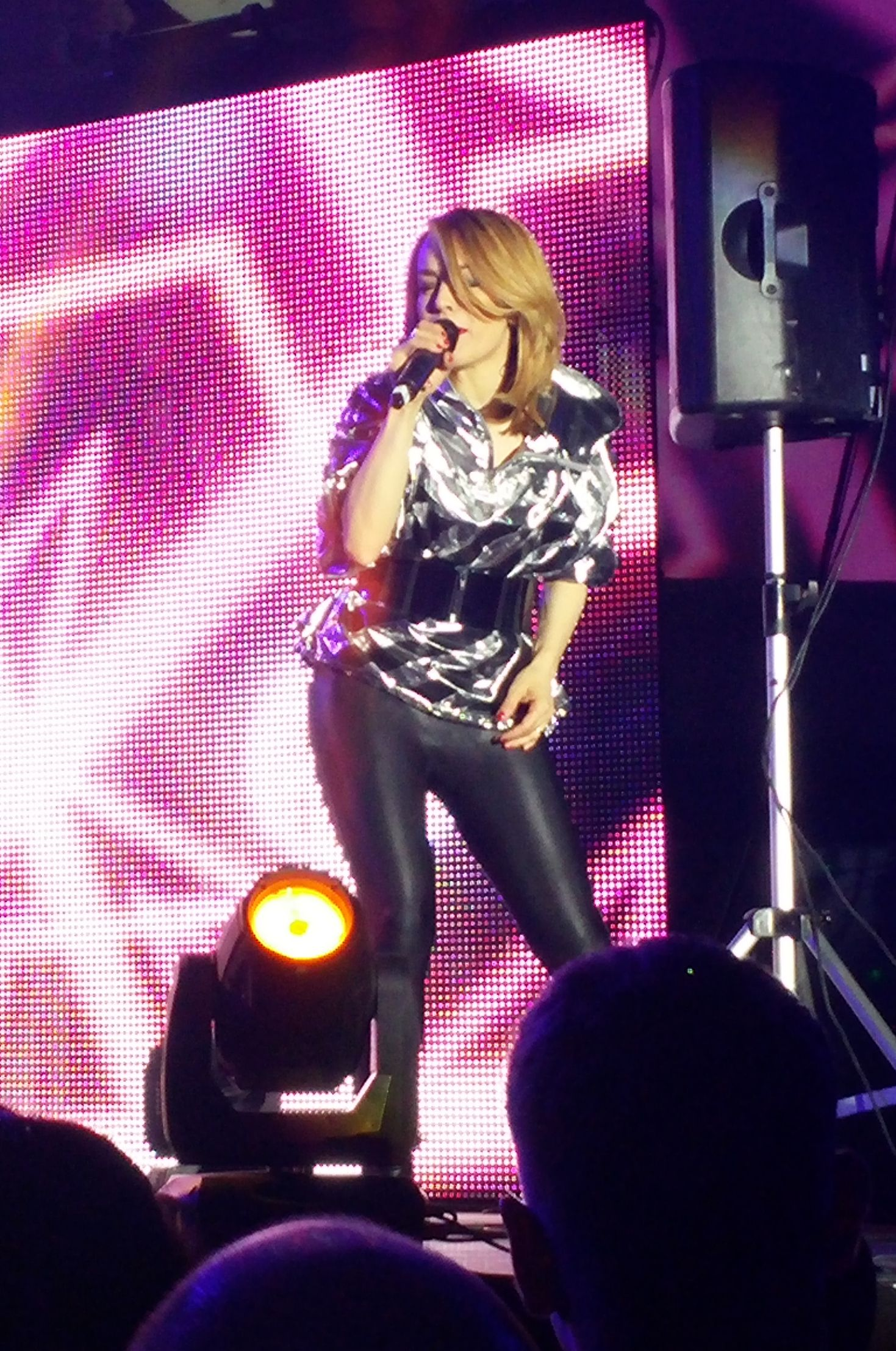
- Alexia on stage in Sofia in 2015

Background information
- Born: Alessia Aquilani; 19 May 1967 (age 59); Arcola, Liguria, Italy
- Genres: Eurodance; pop
- Occupations: Singer; songwriter; composer; record producer
- Years active: 1989–present
- Formerly of: Fourteen 14
- Website: Official website

Alessia Aquilani (born 19 May 1967), known professionally as Alexia, is an Italian singer-songwriter. Before recording in Italian in the 2000s, she made records in English in the 1990s. Many of those were international hits. Before her solo career, she was the vocalist of Ice MC.

She has performed at the Festivalbar nine times, and four times at the Sanremo Music Festival in which she has earned, besides several music critic awards, three second-placings, and one first-placing in 2003.

== Career ==
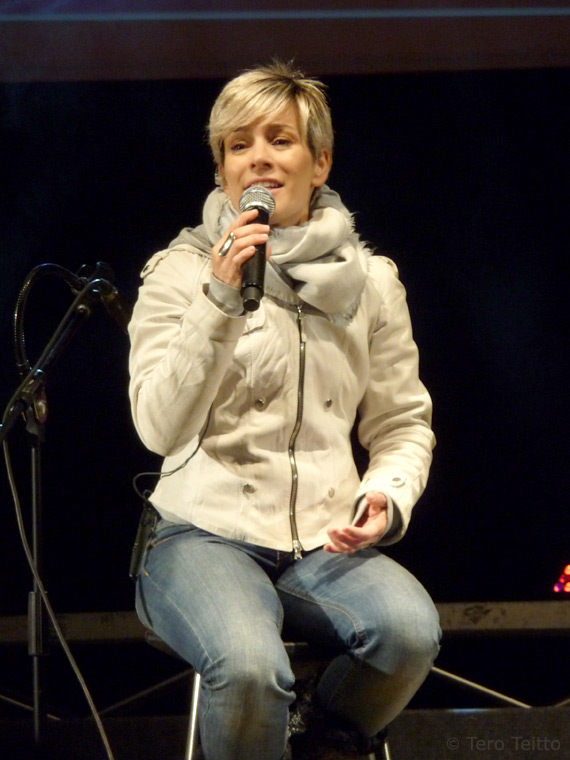
Alexia in 2008

=== Early work ===
Alexia was born in Arcola, Liguria, and from a young age regularly entered singing talent competitions.

She started working for Italian label Euroenergy (by Disco Magic) in 1989 with the singles (Eurobeat/hi-NRG style) "Boy" as Alexia Cooper and "It's All Right" as Lita Beck. One year later, she provided backing vocals to the singles "Cinema" and "Scream" by Ice MC. Later she worked with producer Roberto Zanetti (better known as Robyx) in 1990, as a back-up singer to several of Zanetti's Eurodance acts on his DWA label, including Double You and Ice MC and notably featured on many of the latter's biggest hits such as "Think About the Way" (on the Trainspotting soundtrack), "It's a Rainy Day" and "Russian Roulette". When Ice MC left DWA, Robyx turned his attention to Alexia, and the pair wrote the song "Me and You", which included the vocals of Double You. The song was a big international hit and was followed the next year by "Summer Is Crazy" and "Number One", which again were international hits.

=== International success ===
In early 1997, recording began on Alexia's debut album Fan Club with the final international single from the album, "Uh La La La", preceding it. Unlike her previous singles which were all Eurodance, "Uh La La La" was a slower pop track and would become her breakout hit, becoming a European summer anthem in 1997, hitting the top 10 in many countries.

In early 1998, Alexia officially signed to Sony Music through their subsidiary Dancepool which had released some of Alexia's previous singles in certain territories. After this, work began on breaking her in the UK market and a special remix was commissioned. The resulting Almighty Edit propelled the track into the UK top 10 and was also a hit in Australia. Simultaneously in Europe, Alexia released "Gimme Love", the first single from her second album The Party, which saw her begin to branch away from Eurodance towards Europop, causing disappointment amongst some of her fans. Later that year, "The Music I Like" (her first Eurodance single since 1996's "Number One") was released across Europe, followed by "Keep On Movin'".

1999 saw the release of her third album Happy, along with the singles "Goodbye" and "Happy", with Alexia switching to the Epic label. The album did not have as much success as her previous albums and her career began to decline outside Italy, with the release of "Goodbye" in the UK being delayed then ultimately cancelled.

=== 2000–2001 ===
After five years with Robyx and the DWA team, Alexia released The Hits, a compilation of all her international singles, along with new track "Ti amo ti amo". Shortly after the release, Alexia decided to leave DWA and Robyx as she wanted to expand her sound and audience beyond Eurodance. In November 2000, she duetted with Gianni Morandi on his single "Non ti dimenticherò".

In 2001, her fourth album, Mad for Music, was released and this was the first album she had co-produced. The album and its two singles, "Money Honey" and "Summerlovers", only saw release in Italy but did not meet with the same success in her home country as her previous music had.

=== 2002–2007 ===
In 2002, Alexia abandoned Eurodance and started singing almost exclusively in Italian. She made her first appearance at the Sanremo Music Festival in 2002, coming second with "Dimmi come...", which was on her fifth album Alexia. Two more singles followed, "Non lasciarmi mai" and "Hasta la vista baby". To satisfy international fans, an English version of the album was released, with "Don't You Know" (the English version of "Dimmi come...") meeting limited success in France and Australia. Following this, Alexia's music would be released solely in Italy. The following year, she returned to Sanremo with the song "Per dire di no" and won. The song was from her 2003 album Il cuore a modo mio, which also contained the single "Egoista".

Her most successful Italian album was released in 2004, Gli occhi grandi della luna, which featured two singles: "Come tu mi vuoi (You Need Love)" and "Una donna sola".

In 2005, Alexia released her second greatest hits album spanning her Italian hits, Da grande. The lead single from the album, "Da grande", came second in the women's category at the 2005 Sanremo Festival. After a musical break, Alexia returned in 2007 with a new song, and her first digital download single, "Du Du Du". Following its release, Alexia left Sony Music.

=== 2008–present ===
In 2008, Alexia released her first studio album in four years entitled Ale and a new record deal with Edel. The album was preceded by the single "Grande coraggio" and later followed by "Guardarti dentro". In 2009, Alexia once again participated in the Sanremo Festival singing a duet with Mario Lavezzi titled "Biancaneve". The song was a big hit in Italy, reaching the top 10 and being Alexia's biggest hit for some time. Following this, a re-recorded version of Ale was released entitled Ale & C, which contained three songs from Ale re-recorded as duets, two songs re-recorded in English and two new tracks. "We Is the Power", a duet with Bloom 06 was released as the second single, followed by "E non sai".

On June 22, 2010, Alexia released the album Stars. Only one single, "Star", was released on June 11. In July 2012, a new single, "A volte sì a volte no", was released in Italy. In February 2013, Alexia announced a new version of "Summer Is Crazy" would feature on her upcoming album, ICanzonissime.

In 2015, Alexia released a new album, in Italian, entitled Tu puoi se vuoi, which spawned three singles: "Il mondo non accetta le parole", "Sento" and "Prenditi la vita".

In 2017, Alexia released a new album in Italian entitled Quell'altra which spawned three singles: "Beata gioventù", "La cura per me" (which was chosen as the anthem of the 2017 Milan Gay Pride), and "Fragile fermo immagine".

In 2022, Alexia released her first Christmas album My Xmas, which contains covers of songs by Stevie Wonder, Paul Young, Judy Garland, and Amy Winehouse. In 2024, she performed at Tomorrowland with Nervo, premiering a new version of "Uh La La La".

== Personal life ==
In October 2005, Alexia married Andrea Camerana, Giorgio Armani's nephew, and in February 2007 they had their first child, a girl named Maria Vittoria. She considers herself Roman Catholic.

== Discography ==
- Fan Club (1997)
- Remix Album 98 (1998)
- The Party (1998)
- Happy (1999)
- The Hits (2000)
- Mad for Music (2001)
- Alexia (2002)
- Il cuore a modo mio (2003)
- Gli occhi grandi della luna (2004)
- Da grande (2005)
- Le più belle di... Alexia (2007)
- Ale (2008)
- Collections (2009)
- Ale & C (2009)
- Stars (2010)
- iCanzonissime (2013)
- Tu puoi se vuoi (2015)
- Quell'altra (2017)
- My Xmas (2022)
