= Fan Club (Alexia album) =

Studio album by Alexia
- Released: June 24, 1997
- Genre: Eurodance
- Label: Sony Music
- Producer: Robyx

Alexia chronology
Fan Club (1997)	Remix Album 98 (1998)

Singles from Fan Club
- 1. "Me and You" Released: 1995; 2. "Summer Is Crazy" Released: 1996; 3. "Number One" Released: 1996; 4. "Uh La La La" Released: 1997; 5. "Virtual Reality" Released: 1997 (Finland only); 6. "Hold On" Released: 1997 (Brazil only)

Fan Club (titled Fun Club in the U.S.) is the debut studio album by Italian singer Alexia released in 1997. The album featured mostly eurodance tracks, as was producer Robyx's speciality. It was released in 1997 after the release of Alexia's fourth single "Uh La La La", yet no further singles were released from the album with the exception of two country specific releases of "Virtual Reality" and "Hold On". A version of "Virtual Reality" had already been released in Italy credited to E.Y.E. featuring Alexia.

== Release ==
The album was released on CD and would be the first of Alexia's releases to be released by Sony Dancepool in her home country (Sony Code 487887). Despite her now being signed to Sony, some international versions were released on other labels. As had been the policy with her past singles, Blanco Y Negro released the Spanish version, K-Tel the Finnish release, Spotlight the Brazilian version, Polygram the French release and in the US, the album was released by Popular Records under the revised title Fun Club.

At the end of 1997, a limited edition 'Christmas edition' of the album was released. The track listing was slightly altered along with three additional tracks; "It's Christmas Time" which was the song "Hold On" with different lyrics which had been previously released in Brazil on the "Hold On" single, the Beach mix of "Uh La La La" and the JS16 Clubmix of "Virtual Reality" which had been released on the Finnish only release of the said track.

== Track listing ==
All tracks written & composed by Roberto Zanetti & Alessia Aquilani except where noted.

1. "Uh La La La" – 3:44
2. "Number One" – 3:46
3. "Virtual Reality" – 4:11
4. "Because I Miss You" – 3:58 (Alessia Aquilani; Giuseppe Cominotti)
5. "Summer Is Crazy" – 4:20
6. "Another Way" – 3:53 (Alessia Aquilani; Andrea Di Antoni; Francesco Alberti)
7. "Me and You" – 4:05
8. "Hold On" – 3:48 (Alessia Aquilani; Giuseppe Cominotti)
9. "Looking for My Baby – 3:23 (Alessia Aquilani; Andrea Di Antoni; Francesco Alberti)
10. "Beat of the Night" – 3:48 (Alessia Aquilani; Andrea Di Antoni; Francesco Alberti)
11. "Number One" (Spanish version) – 3:42
12. "Make You Happy" – 3:23 (Alessia Aquilani; Andrea Di Antoni; Francesco Alberti)

The Brazilian version featured the Euro Radio Mix of "Number One" rather than the Spanish version along with the original and Cellular remixes of "Uh La La La".

== Charts ==
Chart performance for Fan club
Chart (1997)	Peak position
Estonia (Eesti Top 10)	3
Finnish Albums (Suomen virallinen lista)	1
French Albums (SNEP)	45

== Certifications ==
Region	Certification	Certified units/sales
Finland (Musiikkituottajat)	2× Platinum	85,530
Poland (ZPAV)	Gold	50,000^{*}
^{*} Sales figures based on certification alone.
