= Il cuore a modo mio =

Studio album by Alexia
- Released: 2003
- Genre: Pop
- Label: Sony Music
- Producer: Alessia Aquilani; Al Portento; Giuseppe Cominotti

Alexia chronology
Alexia (2002)	Il cuore a modo mio (2003)	Gli occhi grandi della luna (2004)

Singles from Il cuore a modo mio
- 1. "Per dire di no" Released: 2003; 2. "Egoista" Released: 2003

Il cuore a modo mio (transl. "The Heart, My Own Way") is the sixth studio album by Alexia released in Italy on 7 March 2003 (Sony Code 511054). This would be the third album in which Alexia had a hand in production. The lead single from the album "Per dire di no" won the Sanremo Music Festival 2003 and reached the Italian Top 10. The second single "Egoista" also reached the Italian charts.

This was the first and, thus far, only Alexia album to feature Intro and prelude tracks.

== Track listing ==
1. "Intro" 0:39
2. "Cuore non hai" 3:11
3. "Preludio 1" 0:03
4. "Saturday Night" 3:07 (Alessia Aquilani)
5. "Preludio 2" 0:03
6. "Per dire di no" 3:26 (Alessia Aquilani & Marcello Salerno)
7. "Crazy War" 4:49
8. "Four Jumps" 1:31
9. "Egoista" 3:32 (Alessia Aquilani & Marcello Salerno)
10. "C'est la Vie" 4:21
11. "Freddo nell'anima" 4:08
12. "Fatti insegnare dalla mamma" 4:11 (Luciana Barletta)
13. "Qualcosa di forte" 5:25 (Luciana Barletta)
14. "Tu mi fai vivere" 4:20 (Alessia Aquilani; Beppe Cominotti)
15. "I Never Loved a Man (The Way I Love You)" 3:11 (Ronnie Shannon)
16. "Per dire di no" (Reprise) 3:55 (Alessia Aquilani & Marcello Salerno)

== Chart performance ==
Chart performance for Il cuore a modo mio
Chart (2003)	Peak position
Italian Albums (FIMI)	17
Swiss Albums (Schweizer Hitparade)	100
