= Happy (Alexia album) =

Studio album by Alexia
- Released: 1999
- Genre: Europop
- Label: Sony Music
- Producer: Robyx

Alexia chronology
The Party (1998)	Happy (1999)	The Hits (2000)

Singles from Happy
- 1. "Goodbye" Released: 1999; 2. "Happy" Released: 1999

Happy is the third studio album by Italian singer Alexia released in 1999, and would be her final studio album to be written and produced by Robyx and the DWA team. The album continued to see Alexia have a broad range of styles, though the move away from eurodance was not as dramatic as it had been with The Party. It was Alexia's first album on the Sony Epic label. Alexia's management team had boasted that every track on the album was good enough to be released as a single, yet only two tracks were released as singles.

Initially, "Change Your Life" was planned as the lead single, but instead "Goodbye" was released. "Happy" followed as the second single. Sony Music Finland announced plans to release "Baby Baby Baby" as the third single in early 2000, though DWA denied this. No record can be found of the track being released physically or as a radio promo, though the Italian Alexia Wikipedia page lists the song as a radio promotional CD and the track was included on Alexia's Hits album.

All the tracks on the album were written by Alexia and Robyx except "Shake You Up" which was written by Francesco Alberti and Andrea Fascetti. The album went gold in Italy a month after its release.

== Release ==
The album was released on CD, cassette and Minidisc through Epic, firstly in Italy in late August then throughout Europe (Sony Code 494999). The Canadian release was in February 2000.

== Track listing ==
All tracks written & composed by Roberto Zanetti & Alessia Aquilani except as noted.

1. "Happy" - 3:14
2. "Change Your Life" - 3:08
3. "Goodbye" - 3:01
4. "Baby Baby Baby" - 3:12 (Gianni Bini; Marco Galeotti)
5. "Te Amo" - 3:34
6. "Giddy Up" - 2:49
7. "I Want You" - 3:23
8. "Save a Prayer" - 3:41
9. "Shake You Up" - 2:40 (Andrea Fascetti; Francesco Alberti)
10. "Close to You" - 2:42
11. "The Rain" - 3:27
12. "Let the Music Play" - 3:00
