= Happy (Alexia song) =

Single by Alexia

from the album Happy
- Released: 1999
- Genre: Europop
- Length: 3:13
- Label: Sony Music
- Songwriters: Roberto Zanetti & Alessia Aquilani
- Producer: Roberto Zanetti

Alexia singles chronology
"Goodbye" (1999)	"Happy" (1999)	"Ti amo ti amo" (2000)

Audio video
- "Happy" on YouTube

"Happy" is the ninth single released by the Italian singer Alexia released in 1999 and is the title track and final single from her third album Happy. The single reached the Italian top 10.

The track was released in Italy on CD and 12" (Sony Code 667996) in October 1999. Like "Keep On Movin'", there was no 2 track CD release. "Happy" was also released in Brazil where it received good radio play and was released in Finland in January 2000. It was the third Alexia single to have a remix by Almighty, but despite the CD having a '12" Almighty Mix' there was no 7"/Radio Edit.

This song is also used in Meteor Garden II and the 50th anniversary of ABS-CBN featuring Kapamilya actors and actresses of each teleserye during primetime.

== Official versions ==
- Album/ Radio Version 3:13
- 2K Noki Short Edit 3:10
- 2K Noki Mix 5:57
- 12" Almighty Mix 6:40
- Pierre J's Remix 6:17
- Pierre J's Dubaholic Mix 7:24

== Charts ==
Chart (1999–2000)	Peak position
Italy (Musica e dischi)	5
Italy Airplay (Music & Media)	10
