= Gimme Love (Alexia song) =

1998 single by Alexia

Single by Alexia

from the album The Party
- Released: 27 March 1998
- Length: 2:57
- Label: Sony Music
- Songwriters: Roberto Zanetti, Alessia Aquilani
- Producer: Roberto Zanetti

Alexia singles chronology
"Hold On" (1997)	"Gimme Love" (1998)	"The Music I Like" (1998)

Audio video
- "Gimme Love" on YouTube

"Gimme Love" is a song by Italian singer Alexia, released in March 1998 as the lead single from her second album, The Party (1998). It reached number one in Italy and charted in the top 20 of the UK Singles Chart, where a complete set of remixes for the British market were issued. It is based on the 1977 song "Gimme Some" by Brendon. A music video was also produced to promote the single.

== Release ==
This was the first of Alexia's singles to be fully released by Sony, with a maxi CD, 2 track CD and 12" being released in Italy (Sony Code 665647) and later Europe. The initial printing run of the maxi contained an error on the cover, titling the track "Gimmi Love". Further print runs of the maxi CD did not feature the track's title on the cover at all. A second 2 track CD was released with a reversed track listing to the original 2 track release.

After Alexia's success in the UK with the Almighty remix of "Uh La La La", a full set of remixes was commissioned for the UK market. A lot of these would go unreleased. An edit of the Pump Friction Vs Precious Paul remix was used as UK radio version, with a slightly longer version of the track being dubbed over the video (this version was only available on the UK edition of The Party album). A video with the 'Club short edit' dubbed over it was also released. Strangely, the second UK CD was re-issued soon after release on a different code albeit with one track less. This may have been due to the new ruling by the UK Chart Industry in June 1998 stating that CD singles were not to be over twenty minutes in length. The song "Summer Is Crazy" was added to the UK and Australian releases as a B-side, but was incorrectly printed as being written solely by Alexia.

A combination of original and UK mixes were featured on the Australian release, with the Club Short Edit being used as the lead radio version.

A digital release of the standard European edition was released digitally in 2006. A further digital release with some of the UK remixes was issued in 2015.

== Music video ==
The accompanying music video for "Gimme Love" was directed by Italian director Luca Lucini. It features the singer performing in a setting featuring a small stair and bookshelfs in the background. Occasionally different people appears, some of them just walking by or watching Alexia. She performs in the same setting throughout the whole video. Towards the end, the room is full of people having a party. Lucini also directed the video for "Uh La La La".

== Charts ==
=== Weekly charts ===
Weekly chart performance for "Gimme Love"
Chart (1998)	Peak position
Europe (Eurochart Hot 100)	41
Finland (Suomen virallinen lista)	6
Iceland (Íslenski Listinn Topp 40)	37
Italy (FIMI)	3
Italy (Musica e dischi)	1
Italy Airplay (Music & Media)	1
Scottish Singles Sales (Official Charts)	20
Spain Maxi-Singles (AFYVE)	1
Sweden (Sverigetopplistan)	37
Switzerland (Schweizer Hitparade)	38
UK Singles (Official Charts)	17

=== Year-end charts ===
Year-end chart performance for "Gimme Love"
Chart (1998)	Position
Europe Border Breakers (Music & Media)	28
