= Hey Boy (Teddybears song) =

2004 single by Teddybears

Single by Teddybears featuring Swingfly

from the album Fresh
- Released: 10 May 2004
- Recorded: 2004
- Genre: Alternative hip hop; electronica; pop-rap
- Length: 3:41 (album version); 3:24 (single edit)
- Label: Epic
- Songwriters: Klas Åhlund, Joakim Åhlund, Richard Silva, Patrik Arve, David Jasmine
- Producers: Fabian "Phat Fabe" Torsson, Teddybears

Teddybears featuring Swingfly singles chronology
"Cobrastyle" (2004)	"Hey Boy" (2004)	"Little Stereo" (2005)

Music video
- "Hey Boy" on YouTube

"Hey Boy" is a song by Swedish group Teddybears from their album Fresh. It was released as the album's second single in 2004 and reached the top 20 in Sweden. The music video received airplay on ZTV.

== Track listing ==
- CD single
1. "Hey Boy" (Single Edit) – 3:24
2. "Hey Boy" (Instrumental Version) – 3:24

== Charts ==
=== Weekly charts ===
Chart (2004)	Peak position
Sweden (Sverigetopplistan)	13

=== Year-end charts ===
Chart (2004)	Position
Sweden (Sverigetopplistan)	49

== Blog 27 version ==
"Hey Boy (Get Your Ass Up)"

Single by Blog 27

from the album LOL
- Released: November 2005
- Genre: Pop
- Length: 3:23
- Label: Magic, Kontor
- Songwriters: Klas Åhlund, Joakim Åhlund, Richard Silva, Patrik Arve, David Jasmine
- Producer: Random

Blog 27 singles chronology
"Uh La La La" (2005)	"Hey Boy (Get Your Ass Up)" (2005)	"Wid Out Ya" (2006)

Music video
- "Hey Boy" on YouTube

"Hey Boy (Get Your Ass Up)" is a song performed by Polish band Blog 27 from their 2005 debut album LOL. The track is a cover version of a 2004 Teddybears' song. It was released as Blog 27's second single in November 2005 and became very popular in Poland, particularly with teenage audiences. The song was released internationally in spring 2006 and charted within the top 40 in other European countries. It could not chart in Blog 27's home country where there was no official singles sales chart at that time, but it did enter a number of radio and magazine charts based on the fans' votes. At the end of 2006, "Hey Boy (Get Your Ass Up)" was singled out by Billboard senior editor Charles Eddy as one of the best songs of 2006, even though the single was not released on the US market.

=== Track listing ===
- CD maxi single
1. "Hey Boy (Get Your Ass Up)" (Short Edit) – 3:23
2. "Hey Boy (Get Your Ass Up)" (Extended Version) – 4:02
3. "Hey Boy (Get Your Ass Up)" (Karaoke Version) – 3:23

"Hey Boy (Get Your Ass Up)" (Video)

- Digital download
1. "Hey Boy (Get Your Ass Up)" – 3:23
2. "Hey Boy (Get Your Ass Up)" (Extended Version) – 4:02
3. "Hey Boy (Get Your Ass Up)" (Karaoke Version) – 3:23

=== Charts ===
Chart (2006)	Peak position
Austria (Ö3 Austria Top 40)	24
Czech Republic (Rádio – Top 100)	37
Germany (GfK Entertainment Charts)	26
Switzerland (Swiss Hitparade)	96

== Torgny Melins version ==
Swedish dansband Torgny Melins recorded a cover of "Hey Boy" for their album Dansbander and released as a single in 2006.

=== Track listing ===
- CD single
1. "Hey Boy" – 3:20
2. "P3 Guld Awards 2006 Medley" – 4:30
