= Gli occhi grandi della luna =

Studio album by Alexia
- Released: 2004
- Genre: Pop
- Label: Sony Music
- Producer: Alessia Aquilani & Al Portento

Alexia chronology
Il cuore a modo mio (2003)	Gli occhi grandi della luna (2004)	Da grande (2005)

Singles from Gli occhi grandi della luna
- 1. "Come tu mi vuoi" Released: 2004; 2. "Una donna sola" Released: 2004 (Radio Promo)

Gli occhi grandi della luna (transl. The Large Eyes of the Moon) is the seventh studio album by Alexia released in Italy on 5 July 2004 (Sony Code 517379). This would be the fourth album in which Alexia had a hand in production. The lead single from the album "Come tu mi vuoi" was written and produced by Sam Watters, Simone Hines, and Louis Biancaniello who had written for Anastacia, with the original English version being a bonus track. The second song to be lifted as a Radio promotional release was "Una donna sola". Both tracks would feature on Alexia's Italian greatest hits CD Da grande along with "Funky al cuore" and "Quello che sento".

The track "Se te ne vai così" was written by Diane Warren and translated into Italian by Alexia, whilst the track "Senza un vincitore" was about Italian cyclist Marco Pantani who had died earlier in the year.

== Track listing ==
1. "Funky al cuore" (Alessia Aquilani; Alfredo Petroli; Francesco Tartarini; Giuseppe Cominotti)
2. "Quello che sento" (Alessia Aquilani; Alfredo Petroli; Francesco Tartarini; Giuseppe Cominotti)
3. "Se te ne vai così" (Alessia Aquilani; Diane Warren; Francesco Tartarini)
4. "Brutta notizia" (Alessia Aquilani; Francesco Tartarini)
5. "Gli occhi grandi della luna" (Alessia Aquilani; Francesco Tartarini)
6. "Senza gravità" (Alessia Aquilani; Alfredo Petroli; Francesco Tartarini; Giuseppe Cominotti)
7. "Come tu mi vuoi" (Louis Biancaniello; Sam Watters)
8. "Una donna sola" (Alessia Aquilani; Alfredo Petroli; Francesco Tartarini; Giuseppe Cominotti)
9. "In volo noi" (Alessia Aquilani; Alfredo Petroli; Francesco Tartarini; Giuseppe Cominotti)
10. "Senza un vincitore" (Alfredo Petroli; Francesco Tartarini; Giuseppe Cominotti)
11. "You Need Love" (Louis Biancaniello; Sam Watters)

== Chart performance ==
Country	Position
Italy	56
