= Summer Is Crazy =

Single by Alexia

from the album Fan Club
- Released: 6 May 1996
- Genre: Eurodance
- Length: 4:20
- Label: DWA Records; Dance Pool
- Songwriters: Roberto Zanetti; Alessia Aquilani
- Producer: Robyx

Alexia singles chronology
"Me and You" (1995)	"Summer Is Crazy" (1996)	"Number One" (1996)

Audio video
- "Summer Is Crazy" on YouTube

"Summer Is Crazy" is a song by Italian singer-songwriter Alexia, released in May 1996, by DWA Records and Dance Pool, as the second single from her debut studio album, Fan Club (1997). Co-written by Alexia with Roberto Zanetti, who also produced it, the song was very successful, reaching number one on the Italian singles chart. It also became a top-5 hit in both Finland and Spain. This was the first of two Alexia singles to feature radio jingles of the track on the CD. The song would also be featured as a B-side on the UK editions of "Gimme Love" in 1998, although due to a misprint, writing credits went only to Alexia. In February 2013, Alexia announced that a new version of "Summer Is Crazy" would feature on her upcoming album, iCanzonissime (2013)

== Release ==
"Summer Is Crazy" was initially released in Italy on CD and 12-inch (coded DWA 96.01), with releases in other European countries following. As with "Me and You", the German edition would be released by ZYX Music, the Spanish release by Blanco y Negro, and the French release by Panic (a subsidiary of PolyGram. A remix release later came out, although this time on both CD and 12-inch. This would be the first of Alexia's singles to be released in certain territories by Sony Music through their subsidiary Dancepool. Two European CD were released–the standard CD and remix CD (Sony code 663521)–in addition to an Australia CD release (Sony code 663486). Alexia's business relationship with Sony would continue until 2005.

== Lyrics ==
The lyrics of "Summer Is Crazy" describe a broken relationship, sung from the perspective of the singer. It tells about how the summer reminds her of their love and the refrain goes like "the summer is crazy, tonight – La, la, la, la". This is further fleshed out with the accompanying music video, showing several individuals in a sad, crazy and/or lonely setting and mood. Eventually it turns out that Alexia is ready to move on, because she knows that "I will never have your love".

== Critical reception ==
AllMusic editor Tom Demalon described "Summer Is Crazy" as a "thumping number replete with tinkling keyboard flourishes" in his review of Fan Club.

== Chart performance ==
"Summer Is Crazy" was a major hit in several countries in Europe, and remains Alexia's most successful release alongside "Number One" and "Uh La La La". It peaked at number one in Italy, spending a total of 17 weeks on the chart, and ended up as the fifth-most-sold single of the year there. The single also peaked at numbers two and three in Spain and Finland, respectively. Additionally, it became a top-20 hit in Latvia, a top-30 hit in both Belgium and Switzerland, and a top-40 hit in Austria and France. On the Eurochart Hot 100, it reached its highest position as number 35 in July 1996, in its ninth week on the chart. In the United Kingdom, "Summer Is Crazy" did not chart on the UK Singles Chart.

== Music video ==
A music video was produced to promote "Summer Is Crazy". The video version was edited up to the end of the middle.

== Track listing and formats ==
- Spain 12-inch vinyl single

A1. "Summer Is Crazy" (Classic Euro Mix) – 6:50
A2. "Summer Is Crazy" (Radio Mix) – 4:20
B1. "Summer Is Crazy" (Nightfly Mix) – 7:22
B2. "Summer Is Crazy" (Blue Mix) – 7:56

- Italy 12-inch vinyl maxi-single

A1. "Summer Is Crazy" (Nightfly Mix) – 7:22
A2. "Summer Is Crazy" (Radio Mix) – 4:20
B1. "Summer Is Crazy" (Blue Mix) – 7:56
B2. "Summer Is Crazy" (Classic Euro Mix) – 6:50

- France CD single
1. "Summer Is Crazy" (Radio Mix) – 4:20
2. "Summer Is Crazy" (Classic Euro Mix) – 6:50
- Germany CD single
1. "Summer Is Crazy" (Radio Mix) – 4:20
2. "Summer Is Crazy" (Dado World Mix Radio) – 3:58
- European CD maxi-single
1. "Summer Is Crazy" (Radio Mix) – 4:20
2. "Summer Is Crazy" (Night Fly Mix) – 7:22
3. "Summer Is Crazy" (Blue Mix) – 7:56
4. "Summer Is Crazy" (Classic Euro Mix) – 6:50
5. "Summer Is Crazy" (Radio Jingle 1) – 0:14
6. "Summer Is Crazy" (Radio Jingle 2) – 0:14
7. "Summer Is Crazy" (Radio Jingle 3) – 0:10

== Charts ==
=== Weekly charts ===
Weekly chart performance for "Summer Is Crazy"
Chart (1996)	Peak position
Austria (Ö3 Austria Top 40)	36
Belgium (Ultratop 50 Flanders)	22
Europe (Eurochart Hot 100)	35
Finland (Suomen virallinen lista)	3
France (SNEP)	31
Italy (Musica e dischi)	1
Latvia (Latvijas Top 50)	15
Spain (AFYVE)	2
Switzerland (Schweizer Hitparade)	25

=== Year-end charts ===
Year-end chart performance for "Summer Is Crazy"
Chart (1996)	Position
Italy (Musica e dischi)	5
Latvia (Latvijas Top 50)	116
