= Per dire di no =

Single by Alexia

from the album Il cuore a modo mio
- Released: 2003
- Genre: Pop
- Length: 3:26
- Label: Sony Music
- Songwriter(s): Alessia Aquilani; Alberto Salerno
- Producer(s): Alessia Aquilani; Al Portento; Giuseppe Cominotti

Alexia singles chronology
"Hasta la vista baby" (2002)	"Per dire di no" (2003)	"Egoista" (2003)

Audio video
- "Per dire di no" on YouTube

"Per dire di no" is the first single from Alexia's sixth studio album Il cuore a modo mio and was released on CD in March 2003 (Sony Code 673593). The CD contained two tracks, with the second track being the 'reprise' version which would be included as a bonus track on the album.

The song was performed by Alexia at the Sanremo Music Festival 2003, where she had come second the year before with "Dimmi come...". This time she came first placed.

The title translates as 'To Say No', with the song describing a man who appeared to be perfect, but may not be so, with Alexia thus saying no and choosing to live a life of solitude.

== Chart performance ==
Chart (2003)	Peak position
Italy (FIMI)	11
Italy Airplay (Nielsen Music Control)	2
Switzerland (Schweizer Hitparade)	83
