= Da grande (song) =

Single by Alexia

from the album Da grande
- Released: 2005
- Genre: Pop
- Length: 3:42
- Label: Sony Music
- Songwriter(s): Alessia Aquilani
- Producer(s): Celso Valli

Alexia singles chronology
| "Una donna sola" (2004) | "Da grande" (2005) | "Mai dire mai" (2005) |

Audio video
- "Da grande" on YouTube

"Da grande" is first single from Alexia's second hits compilation album Da grande and was released on CD in 2005 (Sony Code 675758). The CD contained two tracks, with the second being "Don't You Know", the international English version of "Dimmi come...", that saw a release in some territories outside Italy in 2002. It was the first Alexia release not to feature her on the cover.

The song was performed at the 2005 Sanremo Festival, where it came second in the women's category. Upon its release, the single entered the Italian charts at number 18.

The title translates to "As a grown-up", with Alexia singing how her great love will surprise a man, making his dreams come true.

== Music video ==
A videoclip was filmed for the single, the first time since 2003's "Egoista" and this would be the last video Alexia would film until 2008's "Grande coraggio". The video features a giant Alexia walking and dancing round a city.

== Chart performance ==
| Country | Position |
|---|---|
| Italy | 18 |
