= Keep On Movin' (Alexia song) =

Single by Alexia

from the album The Party
- Released: 1998
- Genre: Europop
- Length: 3:36
- Label: Sony
- Songwriter: Roberto Zanetti & Alessia Aquilani
- Producer: Roberto Zanetti

Alexia singles chronology
"The Music I Like" (1998)	"Keep On Movin'" (1998)	"Goodbye" (1999)

Audio video
- "Keep on Movin'" on YouTube

"Keep On Movin'" is the seventh single released by the Italian singer Alexia released in 1998 and the third and final single from her second album The Party. Although listed on Alexia's Italian Wikipedia page as a Radio promo single, physical versions were released.

For the single version, the opening dialogue of partygoers "Hey Alexia! What a party you are having tonight! How do you organise such a thing?" was cut, replaced by a "Go DJ!", though the dialogue in the middle8 and at the end of the song was left.

== Release ==
The track was released in Italy on CD and 12" (Sony Code 666553) followed by Finland and Spain. Promotional releases were issued in Mexico and Brazil. The song was to be released in the UK, but after the lack of success of both "The Music I Like" and The Party, the idea was scrapped.

== Official versions ==
- Album version 3:36
- Radio Mix 3:36
- Original Long Mix 6:18
- Short Club Edit 3:18
- Club Mix 7:02
- Pearl Radio Edit 4:12
- Pearl Main Vocal Mix 6:12
- Pearl Power Dub 7:55
- Classic Downbeat Experience 6:58
- Cyberapella 3:05

== Charts ==
Chart (1998)	Peak position
Spain (AFYVE)	6
