= Goodbye (Alexia song) =

Single by Alexia

from the album Happy
- Released: 1999
- Genre: Eurodance
- Length: 3:01
- Label: Sony Music
- Songwriter(s): Roberto Zanetti & Alessia Aquilani
- Producer(s): Roberto Zanetti

Alexia singles chronology
| "Keep On Movin'" (1998) | "Goodbye" (1999) | "Happy" (1999) |

Audio video
- "Goodbye" on YouTube

"Goodbye" is a song by Italian singer Alexia, released in 1999 as the first single from her third album, Happy (1999). It is her eight single overall and was the first of Alexia's releases after her switch from the Sony Dancepool label to the Epic label. The track was initially released in Italy on maxi CD, 2 track CD and 12" (Sony Code 667562) on the Dancepool label before being released across mainland Europe. A remix release later came out in Italy on 12" (Sony Code 668157) on the Epic label, the first of Alexia's releases on the Sony subsidiary for which all of Alexia's future releases would be issued by.

Promotional copies were issued in the UK on Dancepool for a release in October 1999 (Sony Code 6683462), along with an extra remix by the Sharp Boys, but the release date got pushed further and further back. The track went unreleased, despite later plans by Dancepool to issue it as a double A side in the UK with Alexia's next single "Happy". Goodbye was later released in Australia on the Epic label (Sony Code 667562). A digital version of the standard release was released in 2006 and a further edition with tracks from the remix 12" released in 2015 which included a previously unreleased by Bad & Coddy.

== Official versions ==
- Original Radio Edit 3:01
- Original Extended Mix 6:30
- M.A.S. Collective Radio Mix 3:27
- M.A.S. Collective Clubmix 7:22
- M.A.S. Collective Dub Mix 6:49
- Roy Malone Radio Mix 3:35
- Roy Malone Ocean Mix 4:36
- Fat Lady Bump Radio Mix 3:02
- Fat Lady Bump Mix 6:32
- T&F Crushed Mendoza Club Remix 4:40
- Sals 8 FM Cut Rmx 3:13
- Sals 8 Extended Mix 6:05
- Bad & Coddy Remix 3:56
- Sharp Boys Club Mix 7:29^{1}

^{1} Unreleased. Only available on the UK promo releases

== Charts ==
=== Weekly charts ===
| Chart (1999) | Peak position |
|---|---|
| Italy (FIMI) | 6 |
| Italy Airplay (Music & Media) | 4 |
