= Mad for Music =

Mad For Music

Studio album by Alexia
- Released: 2001
- Genre: Europop
- Label: Sony Music
- Producer: Alessia Aquilani & Marco Massimo

Alexia chronology
The Hits (2000)	Mad For Music (2001)	Alexia (2002)

Mad for Music is the fourth studio album by Italian singer Alexia released in 2001, and would be her final studio album to be sung exclusively in English. It was her first album that she had a hand co-producing and the first released since her split with DWA and Robyx. Some of the tracks would be recorded in Italian and included on her 2002 album Alexia.

== Release ==
The album was released on CD and cassette through Epic, firstly in Italy in June 2001 then throughout Europe (Sony Code 503153).

== Track listing ==
1. "The Real Thing" - 3:34
2. "Money Honey" - 3:28
3. "Summerlovers" - 3:29
4. "In the Name of Love" - 3:35
5. "The One for Me" - 2:41
6. "Sometimes" - 3:41
7. "Little Sister" - 4:03
8. "Lucky In Love" - 4:18
9. "It's Not the End" - 4:32
10. "Whenever You Want Me" - 4:14

== Singles ==
"Money Honey" is the eleventh single released by Alexia in 2001 and the first single from Mad for Music. It was the first Alexia solo single to be released after her parting from DWA and Robyx and would be the last of her dance music releases. In addition, it was the first release for which Alexia had co-produced. The track was released in Italy on CD and 12" (Sony Code 671206). Remixes were done by T&F who had previously remixed Alexia's single Goodbye.

"Summerlovers" is the second and final single from Mad For Music. The track featured on the Collections budget compilation released by Sony Music in 2009. The track was released in Italy on CD and 12" (Sony Code 671784) on October 28, 2001.
