= Egoista (Alexia song) =

Single by Alexia

from the album Il cuore a modo mio
- Released: 2003
- Genre: Pop
- Length: 3:32
- Label: Sony Music
- Songwriter(s): Alessia Aquilani; Marcello Salerno
- Producer(s): Alessia Aquilani; Al Portento; Giuseppe Cominotti

Alexia singles chronology
"Per dire di no" (2002)	"Egoista" (2003)	"Come tu mi vuoi (You Need Love)" (2004)

Audio video
- "Egoista" on YouTube

"Egoista" is the second and final single from Alexia's sixth studio album Il cuore a modo mio and was released on CD on May 15, 2003. The CD contained two tracks, with the second track being "Tu mi fai vivere" from the album.

The song was performed at the 2003 Festivalbar event to great reception.

The title translates as "Selfish" and indeed the song is about Alexia blasting a former lover as being self-centered and transparent, wanting to have time to himself but not spend any with her, and that she feels much better without him.

== Music video ==
A video clip was filmed for the single and this would be the last video Alexia would film until 2005's Da Grande. The video features Alexia at a fashion parade with the word 'Ego' flashing in the background amongst self-centered models.

== Charts ==
Chart (2003)	Peak position
Italy (FIMI)	46
Romania (Romanian Top 100)	35
