= Alexia (album) =

Studio album by Alexia
- Released: 2002
- Genre: Pop
- Label: Sony
- Producer: Alessia Aquilani; Massimo Marcolini; Christian Gardoni; Mauro Tondini

Alexia chronology
Mad for Music (2001)	Alexia (2002)	Il cuore a modo mio (2003)

Singles from Alexia
- 1. "Dimmi come..." Released: 2002; 2. "Non lasciarmi mai" Released: 2002; 3. "Don't You Know" Released: 2002 (from International edition); 4. "Hasta la vista baby" Released: 2002 (radio promo)

Alexia is the fifth studio album by Italian singer Alexia released in 2002. The album was the first release in Italian. It gave boost to her career. The album was released in Italy on CD and cassette on 8 March 2002. It was certified gold by the Federation of the Italian Music Industry for domestic sales exceeding 50,000 units.

The album contains one English recording, an English version of "Dimmi come..." entitled "Don't You Know" though this would be re-recorded in English again for an international release. Two of the tracks, "Se un giorno" and "L'amore vince" are Italian renditions of the songs "Whenever You Want Me" and "The Real Thing" from her previous album Mad for Music. "Non lasciarmi mai" was released as a single on 24 June 2002 with "Hasta la vista baby" being released as a radio promo third single after the International release of the album.

== Track listing ==
All songs composed and written by Alessia Aquilani & Massimo Marcolini

1. "Dimmi come..." – 3:31
2. "Dire dare" – 3:09
3. "A casa di Jerry" – 3:24
4. "Senza di te" – 4:36
5. "Non lasciarmi mai" – 3:30
6. "Se un giorno" – 4:11
7. "Hasta la vista baby" – 3:47
8. "L'amore vince" – 3:33
9. "Blues" – 4:23
10. "Don't You Know (Dimmi come)" – 3:33

On 24 August 2002, Alexia released a re-recorded version of the album for the international market and it would be her last English studio album. Seven of the tracks were re-recorded in English (including "Don't You Know" being re-recorded), with four lifted from her previous English album Mad for Music (though unlike "Mad for Music", "It's Not the End" and "Whenever You Want Me" were not mixed into each other). The English versions are not all direct translations of the Italian versions, in particular "Non lasciarmi mai". Three tracks from the Italian release are added as bonus tracks, though "Dimmi come..." was not listed on the sleeve. Don't You Know was the only single release from this version of the album.

== International Edition ==
=== Track listing ===
1. "Don't You Know" (previously 'Dimmi Come') – 3:31
2. "Flower Power" (previously 'Dire Dare') – 3:08
3. "Jerry" (previously 'A casa di Jerry') – 3:24
4. "This Is My Life" (previously 'Senza di te') – 4:37
5. "Don't Leave Me This Way" (previously 'Non lasciarmi mai') – 3:35
6. "Whenever You Want Me" (previously 'Se un giorno') – 4:11
7. "Hasta la vista baby" – 3:45
8. "The Real Thing" (previously 'L'amore vince') – 3:33
9. "Blues" – 4:22
10. "It's Not the End" – 4:36
11. "Sometimes" – 3:45
12. "Senza di te" – 4:33
13. "Se un giorno" – 4:13
14. "Dimmi come..." – 3:33

== Personnel ==
- Alexia – arranger, programming, background vocals, producer, drum programming
- Enrico La Falce – mixing
- Wendy Lewis – background vocals
- Roberta Magnetti – background vocals
- Massimo Marcolini – arranger
- Lele Melotti – drums
- Alfredo Petroli – executive producer
- Al Portento – percussion
- Loris Rocchi – make-up, hair stylist
- Simona Silvestri – coordination
- Giuseppe Spada – artwork

== Chart performance ==
Chart performance for Alexia
Chart (2002)	Peak position
Italian Albums (FIMI)	14
Swiss Albums (Schweizer Hitparade)	100

== Certifications ==
Region	Certification	Certified units/sales
Italy (FIMI)	Gold	50,000^{*}
^{*} Sales figures based on certification alone.
