= Me and You (Alexia song) =

Single by Alexia

from the album Fan Club
- Released: August 29, 1995
- Genre: Eurodisco
- Length: 4:05
- Label: DWA Records
- Songwriters: Roberto Zanetti & Alessia Aquilani
- Producer: Roberto Zanetti

Alexia singles chronology
"Me and You" (1995)	"Summer Is Crazy" (1996)

Audio video
- "Me and You" on YouTube

"Me and You" is the first solo single by the Italian singer-songwriter Alexia, released in 1995. It featured guest vocals from Double You and reached number one on the Italian and Spanish charts. The song was co-written by Alexia with its producer, Roberto Zanetti and was initially released in Italy on CD and 12" (coded DWA 01.73), with releases in other European countries following. The German edition would be released by ZYX, the Spanish release by Blanco Y Negro and the French release by Panic, a subsidiary of Polygram. A remix 12" was later released. In 1996, the track was released in the US on Popular Records.

== Critical reception ==
AllMusic editor Tom Demalon described the song as "galloping high-energy track with a Euro-disco flavor". Larry Flick from Billboard magazine complimented "her smoky voice and her flexibility over the track's rubber band-like bassline and galloping beat" in his review of the song.

== Official versions ==
- Radio Edit 4:04
- Extended Euromix 6:45
- Voltage Mix 5:43
- Acappella 4:04
- Groove Remix 5:37
- Ice Fran Remix 6:10
- Denny's Abyss Remix 7:00^{1}

^{1}On a US promotional 12" of "Number One"

== Charts ==
Chart (1995)	Peak position
Europe (Eurochart Hot 100)	45
Israel (Israeli Singles Chart)	8
Italy (Musica e dischi)	1
Spain (AFYVE)	1
