= Number One (Alexia song) =

Single by Alexia

from the album Fan Club
- Released: November 11, 1996 (Italy)
- Genre: Eurodance; Italo-disco; dreamhouse
- Length: 3:46
- Label: DWA Records
- Songwriters: Roberto Zanetti & Alessia Aquilani
- Producer: Roberto Zanetti

Alexia singles chronology
"Summer Is Crazy" (1996)	"Number One" (1996)	"Uh La La La" (1997)

Audio video
- "Number One" on YouTube

"Number One" is a song by Italian singer-songwriter Alexia, released in November 1996, by DWA Records, as the third single from her debut album, Fan Club (1997). Co-written by Alexia with its producer, Roberto Zanetti, the song was her third successive top-5 hit on the Italian singles chart. In both Finland and Spain, it also became a top-5 hit. A set of Spanish versions were released, although these were not specifically for the Spanish market. The accompanying music video was directed by Italian director Alessandra Pescetta, and first aired in January 1997. A sample used at the beginning of the song is from "The Ultimate Piano Collection" by East West, released in 1995.

== Releases and formats ==
The song was released in Italy on CD and 12" (coded DWA 96.06), with releases in other European countries following. Once again the German edition would be released by ZYX, the Spanish release by Blanco Y Negro, the French release by Panic (a subsidiary of Polygram, the Finnish release by K-Tel and the Brazilian release by Spotlight. A full set of releases were commissioned for Europe by Sony Music, once again on their Dancepool label; a Maxi CD, 2 track CD and 12" release (Sony code 663995).

Two remix releases followed; the 'Happy Remix and Spanish versions' remix release and a second release entitled 'remix'. All the tracks across these two vinyl releases were later released on one CD. This would be Alexia's second American release, once again through Popular Records in 1997, with "Me and You" being added on the releases. The American promotional 12" contained a new remix of "Me and You", though it was mistakenly labelled the 'Extended Euromix'.

== Chart performance ==
"Number One" went on to become an international hit on the charts in Europe. It reached number two in Finland, and was a top-5 hit also in Italy and Spain, peaking at number three and four. In Italy, it stayed within the singles chart for a total of nine weeks. Additionally, the single was a top-40 hit in Flemish Belgium and France. On the Eurochart Hot 100, it climbed to number 60 in December 1996, in its second week on the chart.

== Critical reception ==
In September 1997, Larry Flick from Billboard magazine wrote, "Import enthusiasts are already big fans of this fast-paced Italo-disco ditty. Alexia is a charming ingénue with the potential for great things, as evidenced in a performance that has more natural flair and earthy grit than is normally found on records like these. Producer Robyx surrounds her with a strobing dance beat and fluttering flamenco guitars, à la No Mercy's 'Where Do You Go'. One of several festive, hit-worthy jams on Alexia's forthcoming debut album, Fun Club." Pan-European magazine Music & Media described the song as "vocal dreamhouse", noting further, "In the Club Short Mix, the usual piano is replaced by an acoustic guitar which gives the song that lucky holiday feeling."

== Track listings ==
- 7" single, Germany
1. "Number One" (radio mix) — 3:47
2. "Number One" (club short mix) — 3:42
- 12" single, Italy
1. "Number One" (Euro mix) — 7:49
2. "Number One" (Galaxy mix) — 8:30
3. "Number One" (club mix) — 7:02
4. "Number One" (acapella) — 3:42
- CD single, Italy
1. "Number One" (radio mix) — 3:47
2. "Number One" (club short mix) — 3:42
- CD maxi, Europe
1. "Number One" (radio mix) — 3:47
2. "Number One" (club short mix) — 3:42
3. "Number One" (Euro mix) — 7:49
4. "Number One" (club mix) — 7:02
5. "Number One" (Galaxy mix) — 8:30
6. "Number One" (acappella) — 3:42

== Charts ==
=== Weekly charts ===
Weekly chart performance for "Number One"
Chart (1996)	Peak position
Belgium (Ultratop 50 Flanders)	32
Estonia Airplay (Eesti Top 25)	4
Europe (Eurochart Hot 100)	60
Finland (Suomen virallinen lista)	2
France (SNEP)	36
Italy (Musica e dischi)	3
Spain (AFYVE)	4

=== Year-end charts ===
1997 year-end chart performance for "Number One"
Chart (1997)	Position
Brazil Airplay (Crowley)	66
