= Come tu mi vuoi (song) =

Single by Alexia

from the album Gli occhi grandi della luna
- Released: 2004
- Genre: Pop
- Length: 3:58
- Label: Sony Music
- Songwriter(s): Sam Watters, Simone Hines
- Producer(s): Louis Biancaniello & Sam Watters

Alexia singles chronology
"Egoista" (2003)	"Come tu mi vuoi" (2004)	"Una donna sola" (2004)

Audio video
- "Come tu mi vuoi (You Need Love) (Italian Version)" on YouTube

"Come tu mi vuoi" (transl. "The way you want me") is the first single release from the seventh studio album of Italian singer Alexia, Gli occhi grandi della luna, released on 1 June 2004. The track was originally written in English as "You Need Love" and was the lead track on the promotional CD, though the Italian version was released as the lead track on the physical CD release. Sam Watters, the man behind some of Anastacia's biggest hits, wrote and produced it along with Louis Biancaniello and Simone Hines. The duo stated that Alexia was the "Italian version of Anastacia".

Additional writing for the Italian version was done by Roberto Ferri for the verses and Alexia, Emmanuela Cortesi, Giuseppe Lopizo and Monica Magnani for the chorus (though the background choir continue to sing "You need love" in the Italian version). The theme of the Italian version differs to that of the English version. The English version talks of a man's loneliness and need for love in his life, to stay positive, not give in and love will find him and it is not until the end of the song that Alexia sings that it is 'time for me and you', whereas in the Italian version, the man had been alone but Alexia had come into his life though had yet to fully give him what he wanted.

The track was recorded in Los Angeles. The CD was released via Epic (Sony Code 675044), with the promotional release having the code SAMPCS 14109. The song was presented at the 2004 Festivalbar show where it was a success and the song reached number 49 in the Italian charts.

== Charts ==
Chart (2003)	Peak position
Italy (FIMI)	49
