= Dimmi come... =

Single by Alexia

from the album Alexia
- Released: 2002
- Genre: Pop; funk
- Length: 3:33
- Label: Sony Music
- Songwriters: Alessia Aquilani; Massimo Marcolini
- Producers: Alessia Aquilani; Massino Marcolini; Mauro Tondini; Christian Gardoni

Alexia singles chronology
"Summerlovers" (2001)	"Dimmi come..." (2002)	"Non lasciarmi mai" (2002)

Music video
- "Alexia - Dimmi come... (Videoclip)" on YouTube

"Dimmi come..." (Italian for "Tell me how...") was the first single released by the Italian singer Alexia from her fifth studio album Alexia.

It was her first official release in Italian but would be re-recorded in English for an international market entitled "Don't You Know". The song came second at the 2002 Sanremo Festival and was the last of her singles to have remixes commissioned as she moved away from dance music.

The song is about her anger and frustration at being disrespected by her lover who comes into and out of her life. In contrast, the English version on the album is about partying, dancing and loving someone on a Friday night.

== Music video ==
Music videos were filmed for both "Dimmi come..." and "Don't You Know".

== Release ==
The song was initially released in Italy on CD (Sony Code 672332) with an instrumental version as the B side, with a remix release coming out later (Sony Code 672682). The song was recorded in English as "Don't You Know", a bonus track on Alexia's fifth studio album.

"Dimmi come..." spent twelve weeks within the Italian Top 20, her biggest hit in her home country for some time. This was helped by the song being a hit in the Sanremo Festival.

== Official versions ==
- Album Version 3:33
- Instrumental 3:30
- Rmx Radio Edit 4:03
- Rmx Extended 5:29
- P2P Dommu Rmx Radio Edit 3:24
- P2P Dommu Rmx 4:28

== Charts ==
Chart (2002)	Peak position
Italy (FIMI)	4
Romania (Romanian Top 100)	59

== English version ==
"Don't You Know"

Single by Alexia

from the album Alexia
- Released: 2002
- Genre: Pop; funk
- Length: 3:33
- Label: Sony Music
- Songwriters: Alessia Aquilani; Massimo Marcolini
- Producers: Alessia Aquilani; Massino Marcolini; Mauro Tondini; Christian Gardoni

Alexia singles chronology
"Non lasciarmi mai" (2002)	"Don't You Know" (2002)	"Hasta la vista baby" (2002)

Audio video
- "Don't You Know (Dimmi Come...) (English Version)" on YouTube

"Don't You Know" is the English version of the song "Dimmi come..." released by the Italian singer Alexia from her re-recorded fifth studio album Alexia.

=== Release ===
An English version had originally been released on the album Alexia, but when the album was to be recorded in English, the lyrics and of the song would change back to the original theme (of Alexia being disrespected by her lover), yet the melodies would stay intact. Another video was filmed for the song.

In late 2002, the song was released on CD and 12". The P2P Dommu Remix featured on the track listing, albeit with the English vocals instead and the track "Hasta La Vista Baby" was the B side, despite it being sung in Italian. As Alexia had begun recording in Italian, this would be the last of her singles to get a release outside of Italy. Also due to the shift in Alexia's career to radio release singles, this would be the last of her songs to have remixes commissioned.

=== Chart performance ===
Chart	Peak Position
Australia (ARIA)	83
France (SNEP)	70

=== Official versions ===
- Original Version 3:33
- Instrumental Version 3:33
- International Version 3:33
- P2P Dommu Rmx 4:28
