= Uh La La La =

1997 single by Alexia

Single by Alexia

from the album Fan Club (original version) and The Party (Almighty edit)
- Released: 16 June 1997
- Genre: Pop house
- Length: 3:45
- Label: DWA (Dance World Attack)
- Songwriters: Roberto Zanetti; Alessia Aquilani
- Producer: Roberto Zanetti

Alexia singles chronology
"Number One" (1996)	"Uh La La La" (1997)	"Virtual Reality" (1997)

Music Video
- "Uh La La La" on YouTube

"Uh La La La" is a song by Italian singer-songwriter Alexia featuring additional vocals by an uncredited male rapper. It was released by the record label DWA as the fourth single from the singer's debut album, Fan Club (1997), and was co-written by Roberto Zanetti with Alexia. The song incorporates the chorus melody from Kool & the Gang's 1982 single "Let's Go Dancin' (Ooh La La La)".

Produced by Zanetti, the song became a European summer hit of 1997 and was Alexia's international breakout success. It reached the top 10 in Austria, Finland, Ireland, Italy, Scotland, Sweden and the United Kingdom. After its success in Europe, the song was remixed for a UK release the following year, which also saw release in Australia, where it peaked at number 17. This was her last single to be released by different labels in different territories as after this all her releases would be by Sony. The music video for "Uh La La La" was directed by Luca Lucini and filmed in the US.

== Release ==
The song was released in Italy on CD and 12" (coded DWA 97.02), with releases in other European countries following. As before (and for the final time) the German edition would be released by ZYX, the Spanish release by Blanco y Negro, the French release by Panic (a subsidiary of Polygram), and the Finnish release by K-Tel. A full set of releases was commissioned for Europe by Sony Music, once again on their Dancepool label; a maxi CD, 2-track CD, and 12" release (Sony code 664517). Two remix releases followed; one entitled 'Remix' and a doublepack of remixes by Fathers of Sound. The Fathers of Sound remixes would contain vocals and lyrics that were not on the original version. This was the second and last single to feature radio jingles on the CD.

After officially signing to Sony for all future releases, plans were made to properly launch Alexia's career outside of Europe. In 1998, Almighty Records were commissioned to provide a remix and edit for the UK market (Sony code 665567) in order to launch her career. The remix was also used for the Australian release later that year (Sony code 665766). Due to its popularity, the Almighty edit would be released on all versions of Alexia's second album, The Party (1998). In 1999, the track was released in America under the Epidrome label.

== Critical reception ==
AllMusic editor Tom Demalon complimented the song is a "jaunty, infectious number that leans a bit more to pop". Larry Flick from Billboard magazine wrote, "Without question, 'Uh La La La' is as infectious as they get—just perfect for those hot and steamy summer nights. And producer Roberto Zanetti (more commonly known as Robyx) is in ultra-fine form here. In a perfect world, this would surely be a hit." Pan-European magazine Music & Media stated that the song "sounds like a surefire summer hit; a simple sunny melody, a catchy sing-a-long refrain ("Uh la la la, I love you baby"), a stomp/clap rhythm, some nice shuffle beats and a touch of rap. Another sign of success is that the song has already inspired a copy-cat version (2 Eivissa's 'Oh La La La' [...] which samples Crystal Waters' 'Gypsy Woman')." A reviewer from Music Week gave "Uh La La La" three out of five, writing that this "bouncy, piano-driven pop house tune by 25-year-old Italian diva Alexia [...] has enough camp appeal to enjoy wider success." In his 2020 book, Move Your Body (2 The 90's), Juha Soininen described it as "a slow, reggaeish downtempo [track]".

== Chart performance ==
"Uh La La La" peaked at number one on Spain's maxi-singles chart and number four in the singer's native Italy, staying on the Italian chart for 19 weeks. Additionally, the song was a top-10 hit in Austria, Finland, Ireland, Sweden and the United Kingdom. In the UK, it reached number 10 during its first week on the UK Singles Chart, on 15 March 1998. It spent a total of nine weeks within the UK top 100. Additionally, "Uh La La La" became a top-20 hit in France, Iceland, the Netherlands and Switzerland. On the Eurochart Hot 100, it charted within the top 30, reaching number 22 in September 1997, after 13 weeks on the chart. Outside Europe, it peaked at numbers 17 and 30 in Australia and New Zealand, respectively, and number 39 in Canada. In West Asia, it became a top-20 hit in Israel, peaking at number 11 on 1 July 1997. The single earned a gold record in France and Sweden.

== Music video ==
The accompanying music video for "Uh La La La" was directed by Luca Lucini and filmed in the US. It features Alexia performing the song while driving a yellow jeep with her girlfriends on the streets in Miami, Florida. Sometimes she performs standing in the back, while another girl drives. Two black rappers are following them in a black car. On the way, the girls fill up at a gas station. Later, they are stopped by a police officer and starts dancing around him. After the rappers' car engine stalls, they hitchhike with the girls in the jeep. Other scenes show them all on the beach.

== Track listings ==
- 12-inch
1. "Uh La La La" (Club Mix) – 7:26
2. "Uh La La La" (Cellular Mix) – 6:05
3. "Uh La La La" (Original Mix) – 6:30
4. "Uh La La La" (Acappella) – 3:36
- 12-inch - Remix
1. "Uh La La La" (Fargetta's Mix) – 5:30
2. "Uh La La La" (Bump Mix) – 4:55
3. "Uh La La La" (Beach Mix) – 6:22
- CD single
1. "Uh La La La" (Radio Mix) – 3:45
2. "Uh La La La" (Cellular Mix) – 6:05
- CD maxi single
1. "Uh La La La" (Radio Mix) – 3:45
2. "Uh La La La" (Club Mix) – 7:28
3. "Uh La La La" (Cellular Mix) – 6:05
4. "Uh La La La" (F.O.S. Man Vocal Mix) – 6:25
5. "Uh La La La" (Original Mix) – 6:30
6. "Uh La La La" (F.O.S. Renaissance Dub) – 5:40
7. "Uh La La La" (Radio Spot 1) – 0:10
8. "Uh La La La" (Radio Spot 2) – 0:10
9. "Uh La La La" (Radio Spot 3) – 0:10

== Charts ==
=== Weekly charts ===
Weekly chart performance for "Uh La La La"
Chart (1997)	Peak position
Australia (ARIA)	17
Austria (Ö3 Austria Top 40)	6
Belgium (Ultratop 50 Flanders)	34
Canada Top Singles (RPM)	39
Europe (Eurochart Hot 100)	22
Finland (Suomen virallinen lista)	2
France (SNEP)	13
Germany (GfK)	30
Iceland (Íslenski Listinn Topp 40)	11
Ireland (IRMA)	5
Israel (Israeli Singles Chart)	11
Italy (Musica e dischi)	4
Italy Airplay (Music & Media)	9
Netherlands (Dutch Top 40)	17
Netherlands (Single Top 100)	15
New Zealand (Recorded Music NZ)	30
Quebec (ADISQ)	16
Scottish Singles Sales (Official Charts)	9
Spain Maxi-Singles (AFYVE)	1
Sweden (Sverigetopplistan)	5
Switzerland (Schweizer Hitparade)	16
UK Singles (Official Charts)	10

=== Year-end charts ===
1997 year-end chart performance for "Uh La La La"
Chart (1997)	Position
Brazil Airplay (Crowley)	32
Europe (Eurochart Hot 100)	74
Romania (Romanian Top 100)	72
Sweden (Topplistan)	40

1998 year-end chart performance for "Uh La La La"
Chart (1998)	Position
Australia (ARIA)	91
UK Singles (OCC)	136

== Certifications ==
Certifications for "Uh La La La"
Region	Certification	Certified units/sales
France (SNEP)	Gold	250,000^{*}
Sweden (GLF)	Gold	15,000^{^}
^{*} Sales figures based on certification alone.^{^} Shipments figures based on certification alone.

== Blog 27 version ==
"Uh La La La"

Single by Blog 27

from the album LOL
- Released: 2006
- Length: 3:13
- Label: Magic; Kontor
- Songwriters: Roberto Zanetti; Alessia Aquilani
- Producer: Random

Blog 27 singles chronology
"Uh La La La" (2006)	"Hey Boy (Get Your Ass Up)" (2005)

"Uh La La La" was covered by Polish pop music group Blog 27 and released as their debut single in Poland in May 2005. The song enjoyed popularity in the Polish media and later appeared on the band's debut album LOL, released in November 2005. The music video for the track was directed by Anna Maliszewska and features teenagers skateboarding and playing the spin the bottle game. The song was released internationally in early 2006 and entered the Top 40 in German-speaking countries and Italy.

=== Track listing ===
- CD single
1. "Uh La La La" (Short Edit) – 3:13
2. "I Want What I Want" – 3:04
- CD maxi single
1. "Uh La La La" (Short Edit) – 3:13
2. "Uh La La La" (Extended) – 4:23
3. "Uh La La La" (Karaoke Version) – 3:13
4. "I Want What I Want" – 3:03
5. "Uh La La La" (Video)

=== Charts ===
Weekly chart performance for "Uh La La La"
Chart (2006)	Peak position
Austria (Ö3 Austria Top 40)	23
Germany (GfK)	17
Italy (FIMI)	36
Switzerland (Schweizer Hitparade)	36
