= The Scattering (album) =

Studio album by Cutting Crew
- Released: 16 May 1989 (Canada and USA)
- Studios: Curtis Schwartz' Studio (West Sussex, UK); Black Barn Studios (Surrey, UK); Strawberry Studios (Stockport, UK)
- Genres: Rock; pop rock; soft rock; new wave
- Length: 52:43
- Labels: Virgin; Siren
- Producers: Cutting Crew; Peter-John Vettese; Don Gehman

Cutting Crew chronology
Broadcast (1986)	The Scattering (1989)	Compus Mentus (1992)

Singles from The Scattering
- 1. "(Between a) Rock and a Hard Place" Released: Apr 1989 (US) 3 July 1989 (UK); 2. " The Scattering" Released: 1989; 3. "Everything But My Pride" Released: July 1989 (US); 4. "The Last Thing" Released: 26 Feb 1990 (UK)

The Scattering is the second studio album by the English new wave rock band Cutting Crew. It was released on 16 May 1989 in Canada and the USA on Virgin Records, and on 7 August 1989 in the United Kingdom on Siren Records. Despite including the US Adult Contemporary chart hit "Everything But My Pride", it met with little commercial or critical success.

== Background ==
In 1986, Cutting Crew had had a number-one US hit "(I Just) Died in Your Arms", the top 10 hit "I've Been in Love Before", and another Top 40 song, "One for the Mockingbird". All three were released to varying levels of chart success in their native UK and across much of Europe. However, their debut album, Broadcast, was less successful, failing to reach the top 10 in the US and the top 40 in the UK. Executives of Virgin Records were keen on the band delivering a follow-up album that both was popular on its own and had multiple radio-friendly singles lined up.

It was recorded mostly at Curtis Schwartz' Studio in Sussex, England, in 1988, the second-ever album ever to be recorded at the studio. It was set to be released the same year, but its release was delayed by a year due to seemingly managerial disputes, and it was finally released in 1989.

== Songs ==
When asked during a December 2008 interview about his favorite track by Cutting Crew, vocalist Nick Van Eede spoke fondly of the album's title track, stating,

"'The Scattering.' I think it's one of my best lyrics, telling of how the small villages in rural communities can die out when the life blood youth move away to the big cities. We had a lot of fun recording it as we flew down from Scotland with The Whistle Binkies who were a fabulous and famous folk band. We had 5 hours to record all their parts which included Bodhran, fiddle, pipes and accordion. This is still a firm favourite when we play live, even without the folk band!"

In a different interview, Van Eede talked about his frustrations with the continuous delaying of the album before its release, stating the song "(Between A) Rock and a Hard Place" had lyrics pertaining to the scenario.

“We wrote one slightly veiled song having a pop at US A&R antics in our 'Between a Rock and Hard Place' from The Scattering album. I sang, 'I got a brick but I can’t find a window,' as they continually blocked our albums release for months making us lose so much momentum.”

== Critical reception ==
Professional ratings
Review scores
Source	Rating
AllMusic	3/5 stars
The Rolling Stone Album Guide	1/5 stars

In positive review of May 27, 1989, David Spodek of RPM said that "the group have returned with a very strong follow-up" of prominent debut. As per him: "The quality of the material has improved, with their sound having a slightly harder edge to it." Spodek resumed: "this LP is sure to please those who enjoyed the group's first release, and should appeal to those who prefer something a little more filling than the average Top 40 fluff."

Michael Sutton of AllMusic wrote of the album, "...while The Scattering doesn't have ear candy like the band's hit singles, the music is less-blatantly commercial and more personal. It's still slick stuff – big '80s synthesizers, glossy FM radio guitars, in-your-face drums – but Nick Van Eede's vocals have a frosty glow that creates a mood and sustains interest." He ended his review saying, "The Scattering will probably seem dated to anyone who isn't an '80s enthusiast, but it's tasty nostalgia for people who remember the decade fondly. Cutting Crew were obviously infatuated with the arena-sized riffs of U2 and Big Country, and while the group doesn't reach those bands' creative heights, hook-packed material such as 'Everything but My Pride' and 'Tip of Your Tongue' finds them walking tall."

== Chart performance ==
The Scattering peaked at number 150 on the Billboard 200. Its singles also failed to make much impact, although "Everything But My Pride" reached number four on the AOR charts. The late release of the album is often blamed by the band as the primary reason for their stalling momentum and popularity; dissuaded by the commercial under-performance of the album and its singles, bassist Colin Farley and drummer Martin Beedle left the band.

Nick Van Eede and fellow guitarist and bandmate Kevin MacMichael continued, delivering one final Cutting Crew effort in October 1992, Compus Mentus. The album failed to chart, and Cutting Crew disbanded in 1993.

== Track listing ==
All tracks are written by Nick Van Eede and Kevin MacMichael, except where noted.

No.	Title	Writer(s)	Length
1.	"Year in the Wilderness"	Van Eede; MacMichael; Tony Moore	4:44
2.	" The Scattering"		5:01
3.	"Big Noise"		4:00
4.	"Everything But My Pride"		5:10
5.	"Handcuffs for Houdini"	MacMichael	3:43
6.	"(Between A) Rock and a Hard Place"		4:17
7.	"Tip of Your Tongue"	Van Eede; MacMichael; Martin Beedle	3:36
8.	"Reach for the Sky"	Van Eede; MacMichael; Colin Farley	5:04
9.	"The Last Thing"		3:57
10.	"Feel the Wedge"	Farley	5:35
11.	"Binkies Return (Instrumental)"		1:31
12.	"Brag"	Van Eede	6:05
Total length:			52:43

== Personnel ==
Cutting Crew

- Nick Van Eede – lead vocals
- Kevin MacMichael – lead and rhythm guitars, backing vocals
- Colin Farley – bass guitar, backing vocals
- Martin ‘Frosty’ Beedle – drums, percussion, backing vocals

Additional personnel

- Peter-John Vettese – keyboards, sequencing, backing vocals
- Stuart Eydmann – squeezebox (2)
- Mick Broderick – bodhrán (2)
- Mark Hayward – fiddle (2)
- Edward McGuire – flute (2)
- Rab Wallace – pipes (2)
- Danny Cummings – percussion (8)
- Ronnie Aspery – saxophone (9)
- Vladimir Pizowfski – viola (12)
- Charles Bowyer – additional vocals (3)
- Chyna Gordon – additional vocals (3)
- Marcia Johnson – additional vocals (3)
- Jackie Rawe – additional vocals (4, 10)
- The Strawberry Chorale – additional vocals (5)

Technical personnel

- Cutting Crew – producers
- Peter-John Vettese – producer (1–3, 5–11)
- Don Gehman – producer (4)
- Curtis Schwartz – engineer, mixing (12)
- Hugh Padgham – mixing (1–11)
- Teo Miller – additional engineer
- John Pennington – additional engineer
- Matthew Ollivier – assistant engineer
- Al Stone – mix assistant (1–11)
- The Town House (London, UK) – mixing location
- Bob Ludwig – mastering at Masterdisk (New York City, New York, USA)
- Simon Hicks – A&R direction
- Jody Sharp – A&R coordination
- Jeffrey Kent Ayeroff – art direction
- Melanie Nissen – art direction
- Mick Haggerty – design, cover photography
- Simon Fowler – band photography
- Jeb Hart – management
- James Wylie – management

== Charts ==
=== Album ===
Chart (1989)	Peak position
US Billboard 200	150

=== Singles ===
Single	B-Side	Chart	Peak position
"(Between A) Rock and a Hard Place"	"Card House" (Live 1988)	US Mainstream Rock	41
"(Between A) Rock and a Hard Place"	"Card House" (Live 1988)	US Hot 100	77
"(Between A) Rock and a Hard Place"	"Card House" (Live 1988)	Canadian Singles Chart	54
"(Between A) Rock and a Hard Place"	"Card House" (Live 1988)	UK Singles Chart	66
"The Scattering"	"Christians"	UK Singles Chart	96
"Everything But My Pride"	"Contact High"	US Adult Contemporary	4
"Everything But My Pride"	"Contact High"	Canadian Singles Chart	72
"The Last Thing"	"Handcuffs For Houdini"	US Adult Contemporary	17
"The Last Thing"	"Handcuffs For Houdini"	Canadian Singles Chart	90
"Big Noise" (radio-only promo)	–	–	–
