= Think About the Way =

Single by Ice MC

from the album Ice'n'Green
- B-side: "Remix"
- Released: 18 March 1994
- Recorded: November 1993
- Genre: Eurodance; ragga; techno pop
- Length: 4:16
- Label: Polydor (Germany); WEA International (UK); Ariplay Records (France); Dance World Attack (Italy); 12INC (Sweden)
- Songwriter: Roberto Zanetti
- Producer: Robyx

Ice MC singles chronology
"Take Away the Colour" (1994)	"Think About the Way" (1994)	"It's a Rainy Day" (1994)

Music video
- "Think About the Way" on YouTube

"Think About the Way" is a song by British, Italian-based rapper Ice MC, released in March 1994 as the second single from his third album, Ice'n'Green (1994), on which it appears in four versions, and his tenth single overall. It was produced by Roberto Zanetti, also known as Robyx, and was written by Zanetti and Ice MC, though many releases credit Zanetti as the sole writer. The female vocals were performed by Italian singer Alexia, though she was also uncredited and doesn't appear in the accompanying music video, directed by Giacomo de Simone. The song was very successful in Europe, reaching the top 5 in Belgium and Italy, and the top 15 in Denmark, France, Germany, Spain, Switzerland, Sweden and the Netherlands. In the UK and Ireland, it was released under the title "Think About the Way (Bom Digi Bom...)", which it refers to the first words of the first verse.

After being featured in the soundtrack of the film Trainspotting, the song was re-issued in the UK in September 1996, achieving greater success than its original release reaching number 38 in the UK Singles Chart, and number five in the Scottish Singles Chart. Remixes were released in 2002, in 2007 by Frisco vs Ice MC, and in 2009 by Gigi Barocco vs Ice MC.

== Critical reception ==
Pan-European magazine Music & Media concluded, "It was only a matter of time, but the cross between Euro dance and ragga is a fact now. Visualise the male character in Culture Beat as a Jamaican toaster instead of an ordinary rapper." Music & Media editor Maria Jimenez named it a "nearly guaranteed" hit, noting Ice MC's "ragga raps over techno pop beats". Brad Beatnik from Music Week's RM Dance Update wrote, "With a subtitle and chorus of 'bom digi digi bom', plenty of piano and synth, percussion crescendos and a ragga-style vocal, it's not surprising this is currently a huge European hit. It has all the ingredients for being a smash here too." In his weekly dance column, Record Mirror editor James Hamilton commented, "UK born Ian Campbell's unstoppable cheesy Euro smash is an ultra commercial catchy cod 'ragga' rapped and plaintive Jasmine (from Germany) whined 133bpm galloper".

== Chart performance ==
"Think About the Way" was a major hit on the charts on several continents and remains Ice MC's most successful song. In Europe, it entered the top 10 in Belgian Flanders (3), Denmark (9), Italy (4), Scotland (5), Spain (6) and Switzerland (10). Additionally, the single was a top-20 hit in Finland (18), France (14), Germany (14), Iceland (18), Ireland (20), the Netherlands (11) and Sweden (13), as well as on the Eurochart Hot 100, where it peaked at number 18 on August 6, 1994. On the European Dance Radio Chart, it almost peaked atop, reaching number two, behind Cappella's "U & Me", as well as on the European Dance Radio year-end chart and the French Top Dance chart.

In the United Kingdom, "Think About the Way" reached its highest position as number 38 in its second run on the UK Singles Chart, on September 8, 1996. It had previously peaked at number 42 in 1994. On the UK Dance Chart, it was a bigger hit, reaching number six. Outside Europe, the single peaked at number four on the RPM Dance/Urban chart in Canada and was also successful in Israel, reaching number four there, on June 14, 1994. In Latin America, it became a top-10 hit in El Salvador in 1995.

== Music video ==
The music video for "Think About the Way" was directed by Giacomo de Simone, but it didn't feature Alexia, whose vocals are featured on the song. The video was filmed in Filanda Forno in Massa, Italy, and was A-listed on German music television channel VIVA in June 1994. The video was later made available on YouTube in 2014, and had generated more than 87 million views as of July 2025. De Simone had previously directed the video for "Scream" in 1990, and would go on directing the video for Ice MC's two next singles, "It's a Rainy Day" and "Give Me the Light".

== Adaptations ==
Trance DJ and producer act Virtual Vault made a new version of the track featuring the original vocals from Alexia and Ice MC called "Think About The Way 2010". In 2011, the German dance band Groove Coverage made a revamped release also called "Think About the Way" featuring vocals from Rameez. Although the Groove Coverage song released on Suprime Records, Sony Music Entertainment on March 16, 2012, borrows the music and the main refrain of the Ice Mc song, it adds new lyrics in the rest of the song. The Groove Coverage version had been popular in dance venues and a minor hit in Germany reaching number 54 in the German Media Control AG charts.

In 2012, the Iranian-Swedish artist Arash released a musical adaptation of the song called "She Makes Me Go" that borrows widely from the original but with completely new lyrics. Released on initially on EMI Music Sweden and Extravaganza Records on September 17, 2012, it featured Jamaican dancehall singer Sean Paul and was co-written by Roberto Zanetti, Alex Arash Labaf and Sean Henriques (Sean Paul). Re-released on February 15, 2013, on Universal Music in Germany and other European countries, "She Makes Me Go" has charted in Germany, Switzerland, Austria, Romania and Poland.

In 2013, Canadian DJ Anthony Simons produced a cover with Anna Berardi.

== Track listings ==
- 12" maxi, UK (1996)
1. "Bom Digi Bom" (the Dyme Brothers mix) – 6:05
2. "Bom Digi Bom" (original extended mix) – 7:12
3. "Bom Digi Bom" (LuvDup 'Cliffy' vocal mix) – 7:09
4. "Bom Digi Bom" (the Dyme Brothers dub)
- 12" maxi, Belgium, Italy, France, Germany (1994)
1. "Think About the Way" (extended mix) – 7:08
2. "Think About the Way" (doop dibby dub mix) – 3:20
3. "Think About the Way" (radio mix) – 4:16
4. "Think About the Way" (a cappella) – 4:16 (track not available for France and Germany)
- CD single, France (1994)
1. "Think About the Way" (radio mix) – 4:16
2. "Think About the Way" (extended mix) – 7:08
- CD single, UK (1994)
1. "Think About the Way" (original radio edit) – 4:19
2. "Think About the Way" (LuvDup "Cliffy" vocal mix) – 7:09
3. "Think About the Way" (Jules & Skins pumped up club mix) – 5:55
4. "Think About the Way" (original extended Italian mix) – 7:12
5. "Think About the Way" (doop dibby dub) – 3:19
6. "Think About the Way" (Jules & Skins dattman reggae jam) – 6:16
- CD maxi, Germany, Belgium, France, Italy, Sweden (1994)
1. "Think About the Way" (radio mix) – 4:16
2. "Think About the Way" (extended mix) – 7:08
3. "Think About the Way" (doop dibby dub mix) – 3:20
4. "Think About the Way" (a cappella) – 4:16
- CD maxi, UK (1994)
1. "Think About the Way" (original radio edit) – 4:19
2. "Think About the Way" (LuvDup "Cliffy" vocal mix) – 7:09
3. "Think About the Way" (Jules & Skins pumped up club mix) – 5:55
4. "Think About the Way" (original extended Italian mix) – 7:12
5. "Think About the Way" (doop dibby dub) – 3:19
6. "Think About the Way" (Jules & Skins dattman reggae jam) – 6:16
- CD maxi, US / 12" maxi, Germany (1994)
1. "Think About the Way" (noche de luna mix) – 6:22
2. "Think About the Way" (dattman reggae jam) – 6:17
3. "Think About the Way" (extended mix) – 7:12
4. "Think About the Way" (pumped up club mix) – 5:54
5. "Think About the Way" (LuvDup mix) – 7:09
6. "Think About the Way" (pumped up with girl) – 3:58
- CD maxi, Canada (1994)
1. "Think About the Way" (radio mix) – 4:17
2. "Think About the Way" (extended mix) – 7:10
3. "Think About the Way" (noche de luna mix) – 6:22
4. "Think About the Way" (dattman reggae jam) – 6:14
5. "Think About the Way" (LuvDup dub) – 7:03
6. "Think About the Way" (pumped up club mix) – 5:51
7. "Think About the Way" (LuvDup remix) – 7:03
8. "Think About the Way" (pumped up with girl) – 5:53
- CD maxi, UK (1996)
1. "Bom Digi Bom (Think About the Way)" (radio edit) – 3:48
2. "Bom Digi Bom (Think About the Way)" (original extended mix) – 7:12
3. "Bom Digi Bom (Think About the Way)" (the Dyme Brothers mix) – 6:05
4. "Bom Digi Bom (Think About the Way)" (Jules & Skins pumped up club mix) – 5:55
5. "Bom Digi Bom (Think About the Way)" (LuvDup 'Cliffy' vocal mix) – 7:09
6. "Bom Digi Bom (Think About the Way)" (doop dibby dub) – 3:19
- CD maxi - Remixes, Germany (1994)
1. "Think About the Way" (noche de luna mix) – 6:22
2. "Think About the Way" (dattman reggae) – 6:18
3. "Think About the Way" (pumped up club mix) – 5:54
- CD maxi - Remixes, Italy (1994)
1. "Think About the Way" (radio mix) – 4:16
2. "Think About the Way" (noche de luna mix) – 6:22
3. "Think About the Way" (dattman reggae jam) – 6:18
4. "Think About the Way" (LuvDup dub) – 7:10
5. "Think About the Way" (pumped club mix) – 5:54
6. "Think About the Way" (LuvDup remix) – 7:10
7. "Think About the Way" (pumped up with girl) – 5:58

== Charts ==
=== Weekly charts ===
Chart (1994–1995)	Peak position
Australia (ARIA)	185
Austria (Ö3 Austria Top 40)	22
Belgium (Ultratop 50 Flanders)	3
Canada Dance/Urban (RPM)	4
Denmark (IFPI)	9
El Salvador (UPI)	7
Europe (Eurochart Hot 100)	18
Europe (European Dance Radio)	2
Finland (Suomen virallinen lista)	18
France (SNEP)	14
France Dance (Top Dance)	2
Germany (GfK)	14
Iceland (Íslenski Listinn Topp 40)	18
Ireland (IRMA)	20
Israel (Israeli Singles Chart)	4
Italy (Musica e dischi)	4
Netherlands (Dutch Top 40)	11
Netherlands (Single Top 100)	11
Scottish Singles Sales (Official Charts)	39
Spain (AFYVE)	6
Sweden (Sverigetopplistan)	13
Switzerland (Schweizer Hitparade)	10
UK Singles (Official Charts)	42
UK Dance (Official Charts)	6
UK Dance Singles (Music Week)	6
UK Club Chart (Music Week)	8
UK Pop Tip Club Chart (Music Week)	7

Chart (1996)	Peak position
Scottish Singles Sales (Official Charts)	5
UK Singles (Official Charts)	38
UK Dance (Official Charts)	28
UK Pop Tip Club Chart (Music Week)	6

Chart (2007) ^{1}	Peak position
Finland (Suomen virallinen lista)	7

^{1} By Frisco vs. Ice MC

=== Year-end charts ===
Chart (1994)	Position
Belgium (Ultratop Flanders)	37
Canada Dance/Urban (RPM)	48
Europe (Eurochart Hot 100)	58
Europe (European Dance Radio)	2
France (SNEP)	34
Germany (Official German Charts)	58
Italy (Musica e dischi)	6
Netherlands (Dutch Top 40)	101
Netherlands (Single Top 100)	96
Sweden (Sverigetopplistan)	55
