= (Between a) Rock and a Hard Place =

Single by Cutting Crew

from the album The Scattering
- B-side: "Card House"
- Released: 1989
- Length: 3:48
- Label: Siren; Virgin
- Songwriters: Nick Van Eede; Kevin MacMichael
- Producers: Cutting Crew; Peter-John Vettese

Cutting Crew singles chronology
"Any Colour" (1987)	"(Between a) Rock and a Hard Place" (1989)	"The Scattering" (1989)

"(Between a) Rock and a Hard Place" is a song by the English band Cutting Crew, released in 1989 as the lead single from their second studio album, The Scattering.

Singer Nick Van Eede stated in interviews that the lyrics of "(Between a) Rock and a Hard Place" were inspired by personal struggles and the pressures of navigating life's challenges. The song reflects the emotional intensity and resilience required to overcome difficult circumstances.

== Charts ==
Chart (1989)	Peak position
Canada Top Singles (RPM)	54
UK Singles (Official Charts)	66
US Billboard Hot 100	77
