= She Makes Me Go =

Single by Arash featuring Sean Paul

from the album Superman
- Released: 17 September 2012
- Recorded: 2008
- Genre: Eurodance; techno; pop
- Length: 2:59
- Label: EMI Music Sweden; Extravaganza Records
- Songwriters: Arash; Roberto Zanetti; Sean Henriques
- Producers: Arash; Robert Uhlmann

Arash singles chronology
"Melody" (2011)	"She Makes Me Go" (2012)	"One Day" (2014)

Sean Paul singles chronology
"Touch the Sky" (2012)	"She Makes Me Go" (2012)	"What About Us" (2012)

Music video
- "She Makes Me Go" on YouTube

"She Makes Me Go" is a song by Iranian singer, entertainer and producer Arash released as a single from his fourth studio album, Superman, which was released in November 2014. The song features Sean Paul.

It was originally released on 17 September 2012 on EMI Music Sweden. It was relaunched on 15 February 2013 in European markets including German, Austrian, French and Swiss markets on Universal Music. The song's music and arrangement is an adaptation of ICE MC's hit "Think About the Way".

== Adaptation ==
Substantial parts of the song are taken from an earlier 1994 hit written by the Italian singer, songwriter and music producer Roberto Zanetti (aka Savage and Robyx) and performed by British hip-house / Eurodance artist ICE MC entitled "Think About the Way". The ICE MC dance hit had featured Alexia on vocals. The Arash hit also borrows the hit's catch-phrase expression "Bom Digi Digi Bom" in the new release.

The earlier song had been an international hit for ICE MC (real name Ian Campbell) with top 10 appearances in Belgium, Italy and Switzerland, and top 20 showing in France, Germany, Netherlands and Sweden and made it to number 38 in the UK Top 40 charts.

In 2012, the song had also been adapted and revamped in yet another version by German dance band Groove Coverage featuring vocals from Rameez. That version had been popular in dance venues and a minor hit in Germany reaching number 54 in the German Media Control AG charts.

== Music video ==
The music video for this single was released on 11 December 2012. Directed by Fredrik Boklund and shot in Atlanta, Georgia by Radiant3, the video shows Arash and Sean Paul in a pool-side party with a lot of girls dancing. There are also many scenes shot inside the posh house, which had earlier been shooting location for the 2009 American comedy horror film Zombieland.

== Track listing ==
Digital download

1. "She Makes Me Go (Radio)" – 2:59
2. "She Makes Me Go (Mike Candys Remix)" – 4:43
3. "She Makes Me Go (Extended)" – 4:35
4. "She Makes Me Go (Garmiani Remix)" – 5:07

== Credits and personnel ==
- Lead vocals – Arash, Sean Paul
- Producers – Arash Labaf, Robert Uhlmann
- Lyrics – Arash Labaf, Robert Uhlmann, Roberto Zanetti, Sean Henriques
- Label: WarnerChappell, Universal Music, EMI Music Publishing and Extravaganza Publishing

== Collaborations ==
During the 2013 MAD Music Awards, Arash performed a live multilingual version of the song in collaboration with the Greek singer Stan with the latter singing added Greek language lyrics.

== Charts ==
=== Weekly charts ===
Weekly chart performance for "She Makes Me Go"
Chart (2012–2013)	Peak position
Austria (Ö3 Austria Top 40)	8
Belgium (Ultratip Bubbling Under Flanders)	3
Belgium (Ultratop 50 Wallonia)	24
Czech Republic Airplay (ČNS IFPI)	12
Finland (Suomen virallinen lista)	11
France (SNEP)	16
Germany (GfK)	5
Greece Digital Songs (Billboard)	8
Hungary (Editors' Choice Top 40)	17
Netherlands (Dutch Top 40 Tipparade)	20
Poland Dance (ZPAV)	4
Russia Airplay (TopHit)	31
Slovakia Airplay (ČNS IFPI)	3
Sweden (Sverigetopplistan)	55
Switzerland (Schweizer Hitparade)	13
Switzerland (Media Control Romandy)	18
Ukraine Airplay (TopHit)	26

=== Year-end charts ===
Year-end chart performance for "She Makes Me Go"
Chart (2013)	Position
Austria (Ö3 Austria Top 40)	53
Belgium (Ultratop Wallonia)	98
Germany (Media Control AG)	49
Switzerland (Schweizer Hitparade)	55
Ukraine Airplay (TopHit)	136

== Certifications and sales ==
Region	Certification	Certified units/sales
France	—	30,400
Germany (BVMI)	Gold	150,000^{^}
Switzerland (IFPI Switzerland)	Gold	15,000^{^}
^{^} Shipments figures based on certification alone.

== Release history ==
Region	Date	Format	Label
Worldwide	17 September 2012	Digital download	EMI Music Sweden
Germany	15 February 2013	Digital download	Universal Music
