= Take Away the Colour =

Single by Ice MC

from the album Ice'n'Green
- B-side: "Remix"
- Released: 18 September 1993
- Genre: Euro-electronica, Techno
- Length: 3:25
- Label: Polydor (Germany); Ariplay Records (France); Dance World Attack (Italy); Blanco Y Negro (Spain); Dance Pool (Australia); 12INC (Sweden)
- Songwriter: Roberto Zanetti
- Producer: Roberto Zanetti

Ice MC singles chronology
"Scream" (1990)	"Take Away the Colour" (1993)	"Think about the Way" (1994)
"It's a Rainy Day" (1994)	"Take Away the Colour (95' Reconstruction)" (1995)	"Ice'n'Mix" (1995)

Music video
- "Take Away the Colour" on YouTube

"Take Away the Colour" is a song by British Eurodance artist Ice MC. It was released in September 1993 as the first single from his third album, Ice'n'Green (1994), on which it appears as third track, and his ninth single overall. It was written and produced by Robyx, while the female vocals were performed by Simona Jackson. Jasmin Heinrich appeared in the music video and in live performances lip-synching to Jackson's vocals. The song was reissued a year later, in 1995, in a new version entitled "Take Away the Colour ('95 Reconstruction)", however, this version is performed by Alexia. The first version was more successful, reaching the top 20 in Austria, Belgium (Wallonia and Flanders), Italy and Sweden, while both versions reached number 31 in France. The B-side featuring on the various formats of the 1995 release is a megamix composed by Ice MC's hit singles "Think about the Way", "It's a Rainy Day" and "Take Away the Colour". This megamix was the next single in France and was only released in this country.

== Track listings ==
These are the formats and track listings of major single releases of "Take Away the Colour".

=== 1994 release ===
- CD maxi - Europe
1. "Take Away the Colour" (radio mix) — 3:29
2. "Take Away the Colour" (HF mix) — 6:45
3. "Take Away the Colour" (VCF mix) — 5:08
- CD maxi - Australia
1. "Take Away the Colour" (radio mix) — 3:25
2. "Take Away the Colour" (HF mix) — 6:41
3. "Take Away the Colour" (Rob X remix) — 6:14
4. "Take Away the Colour" (to be sampled) — 3:27
- CD single
1. "Take Away the Colour" (radio mix) — 3:28
2. "Take Away the Colour" (HF mix) — 6:44
- 12" maxi - Europe
1. "Take Away the Colour" (HF mix) — 6:41
2. "Take Away the Colour" (VCF mix) — 5:06
3. "Take Away the Colour" (radio mix) — 3:25
- CD maxi - Remixes - Germany
1. "Take Away the Colour" (Rob X remix) — 6:14
2. "Take Away the Colour" (uannanatu remix) — 7:10
3. "Take Away the Colour" (trance dub) — 6:23
- CD maxi - Remixes - Italy
1. "Take Away the Colour" (radio 7" version) — 3:25
2. "Take Away the Colour" (Rob X remix) — 6:14
3. "Take Away the Colour" (FOS vocal dub) — 7:17
4. "Take Away the Colour" (uannanatu remix) — 7:10
5. "Take Away the Colour" (trance dub) — 6:33
6. "Take Away the Colour" (VCF mix) — 5:06
7. "Take Away the Colour" (to be sampled) — 3:27
- 12" maxi - Remixes
1. "Take Away the Colour" (Rob X remix) — 6:14
2. "Take Away the Colour" (FOS vocal dub) — 7:18
3. "Take Away the Colour" (uannanatu remix) — 7:10
4. "Take Away the Colour" (trance dub) — 6:33
5. "Take Away the Colour" (to be sampled) — 3:27

=== 1995 release ===
- CD maxi - Sweden
1. "Take Away the Colour" ('95 Reconstruction short radio edit) — 3:59
2. "Take Away the Colour" ('95 Reconstruction) — 5:27
3. "Megamix (extended version) — 8:44
4. "Take Away the Colour" (original LP version) — 3:25
5. "Megamix (short radio version) — 4:14
6. "Take Away the Colour" (Rob X remix) — 6:14
- CD maxi - Belgium
1. "Take Away the Colour" (original LP version) — 3:25
2. "Take Away the Colour" ('95 Reconstruction short) — 3:59
3. "Take Away the Colour" ('95 Reconstruction long) — 5:27
4. "Take Away the Colour" (Rob X remix) — 6:14
5. "Megamix Short" — 4:14
6. "Megamix Long" — 8:44
- CD maxi - Germany
1. "Take Away the Colour" ('95 Reconstruction) — 3:59
2. "Megamix" (short version) — 4:14
3. "Take Away the Colour" ('95 Reconstruction) — 5:27
4. "Take Away the Colour" (Rob X remix) — 6:14
- CD single - France, Belgium
1. "Take Away the Colour" (original LP version) — 3:25 (Belgium only)
2. "Take Away the Colour" ('95 Reconstruction short) — 3:59
3. "Take Away the Colour" ('95 Reconstruction long version) — 5:27 (France only)
- 12" maxi - Belgium
1. "Take Away the Colour" ('95 Reconstruction short) — 3:59
2. "Take Away the Colour" (Rob X remix) — 6:14
3. "Take Away the Colour" (original LP version) — 3:25
4. "Take Away the Colour" ('95 Reconstruction long) — 5:27
5. "Megamix Short" — 4:14
- 12" maxi - Germany, Spain, Italy
1. "Take Away the Colour" ('95 Reconstruction) — 5:27
2. "Take Away the Colour" ('95 Reconstruction short) — 3:59
3. "Megamix" (extended version) — 8:44
4. "Megamix" (short version) — 4:14
- 12" maxi - France
1. "Take Away the Colour" ('95 Reconstruction) — 5:27
2. "Take Away the Colour" (Rob X remix) — 6:14

== Charts ==
=== Weekly charts ===
Weekly chart performance for "Take Away the Colour"
Chart (1994–1995)	Peak position
Australia (ARIA)	114
Austria (Ö3 Austria Top 40)	11
Belgium (Ultratop 50 Flanders)	15
Belgium (Ultratop 50 Wallonia)	11
Europe (Eurochart Hot 100)	80
Europe (European Dance Radio)	17
Finland (Suomen virallinen lista)	16
France (SNEP)	31
Italy (Musica e dischi)	17
Sweden (Sverigetopplistan)	18

Weekly chart performance for "Take Away the Colour" ('95 Reconstruction)
Chart (1995)	Peak position
France (SNEP)	31
Netherlands (Dutch Top 40)	25
Netherlands (Single Top 100)	25

=== Year-end charts ===
1995 version

Chart (1995)	Position
Belgium (Ultratop 50 Wallonia)	37
Netherlands (Dutch Top 40)	221
