= Scattering (disambiguation) =

In physics, scattering is a wide range of physical processes where moving particles or radiation are forced to deviate from a straight trajectory.

Scattering or the scattering may also refer to:

== Entertainment ==
- The Scattering (album), a 1989 album by English rock band Cutting Crew
  - "The Scattering" (song), a track from the above album
- The Scattering (Dune), a great forced exodus in Dune science fiction novels
- The Scattering of Ashes, a 2006 studio album by the Canadian heavy metal band Into Eternity
- Scattering Dad, a 1998 American made-for-television drama film
- A Scattering of Salts, a 1995 poetry collection by James Merrill
- A Scattering of Seeds, a Canadian documentary television series (1998–2001)
- Scattering Stars Like Dust, a 1998 solo album by Iranian musician Kayhan Kalhor
- Spring Scattering Stars, a 1927 painting by American artist Edwin Blashfield

== Geography ==
- Scattering Branch, a stream in the U.S. state of Missouri
- Scattering Fork, a stream in the U.S. state of Missouri

== Other uses ==
- Scattering of ashes, the dispersal of human remains following cremation
- Scattering CJ, a Facebook page created to facilitate the scattering of ashes of an American man
