= Everything But My Pride =

Single by Cutting Crew

from the album The Scattering
- B-side: "Big Noise"
- Released: 1989
- Length: 3:59
- Label: Virgin
- Songwriters: Nick Van Eede; Kevin MacMichael
- Producers: Cutting Crew; Don Gehman

Cutting Crew singles chronology
"The Scattering" (1989)	"Everything But My Pride" (1989)	"The Last Thing" (1990)

"Everything But My Pride" is a song by the English rock band Cutting Crew, released in 1989 as the third single from their second studio album, The Scattering.

== Reception ==
Billboard said that the "melodic midtempo track exudes more of a distinctive and dramatic hook than its predecessor."

== Charts ==
Chart (1989)	Peak position
Canada Top Singles (RPM)	72
US Adult Contemporary (Billboard)	4
