= The Scattering (song) =

Single by Cutting Crew

from the album The Scattering
- B-side: "Christians"
- Released: 1989
- Length: 4:28
- Label: Siren Records; Virgin
- Songwriters: Nick Van Eede; Kevin MacMichael
- Producers: Cutting Crew; Peter-John Vettese

Cutting Crew singles chronology
"(Between a) Rock and a Hard Place" (1989)	"The Scattering" (1989)	"Everything But My Pride" (1989)

"The Scattering" is a song by the English rock band Cutting Crew, released in 1989 as the second single from their second album, also titled The Scattering.

== Charts ==
Chart (1989)	Peak position
UK Singles (Official Charts)	96
