= Ice'n'Green =

Studio album by ICE MC
- Released: 15 May 1994
- Length: 1:01:03
- Labels: Polydor, ZYX
- Producer: Robyx

ICE MC chronology
My World - The Early Songs (1990)	Ice'n'Green (1994)	Ice'n'Green - The Remix Album (1995)

Singles from Ice'n'Green
- 1. "Take Away the Colour" Released: 1994; 2. "Think About the Way" Released: 1994; 3. "It's a Rainy Day" Released: 1994; 4. "Russian Roulette" Released: 1995; 5. "Run Fa cover" Released: 1995

Professional ratings
Review scores
Source	Rating
Allmusic	2.5/5 stars
Music & Media	Favorable

Ice'n'Green is a 1994 album by British-Italian based Eurodance artist ICE MC. It was his third album and produced three successful singles. It includes two versions for each of two of his greatest hits, "It's a Rainy Day" and "Think About the Way". Later, the album was re-released with remixed versions and was re-entitled Ice'n'Green (The Remix Album). Roberto Zanetti, well known under his pseudonym of Robyx, wrote and produced all tracks.

The album achieved success in France, where it peaked at #5 for two weeks in January 1995. It remained in the top 50 for twenty weeks and eventually earned a gold disc. It was briefly ranked for a sole week in Austria, three weeks in Sweden, six weeks in Switzerland and nine weeks in Germany, but was unable to reach the top 30 in these countries. The album passed almost unnoticed in the U.S. and was not charted in the UK.

== Critical reception ==
Generally, the album received positive reviews from critics. Allmusic stated, "Like many dance albums, this has too many tracks that sound alike, but Ice'n'Green is a lot of fun and consistently enjoyable." Music & Media wrote, "Ice Cube, Ice T. and Ice MC. Despite their obsession with ice, they've found three different ways to defrost the airwaves. Italy's contender, the MC that is, is the Euro dance kind as we've seen from the hits Think About The Way and It's A Rainy Day. But he's much more than just vintage continental, and is branching out into ragga as well (Labba Ling)."

== Track listing ==
1. "It's a Rainy Day" Robyx — 4:12
2. "Labba Ling" Malatesti, Robyx, Salani, Vivaldi — 4:06
3. "Take Away the Colour" Robyx — 3:25
4. "Think About the Way" Robyx — 4:16
5. "Look After Nature" Malatesti, Robyx, Salani, Vivaldi — 3:50
6. "Run Fa Cover" Malatesti, Robyx, Salani, Vivaldi — 4:37
7. "Russian Roulette" Malatesti, Robyx, Salani, Vivaldi — 4:23
8. "The Britaican" Malatesti, Robyx, Salani, Vivaldi — 3:20
9. "Dark Night Rider" Malatesti, Robyx, Salani, Vivaldi — 4:09
10. "It's a Rainy Day" (happyman radio mix)" Robyx — 3:23
11. "Funkin' With You" Robyx — 3:25
12. "Afrikan Buzz" Robyx — 3:50
13. "Think About the Way" (Pumped Up Club Mix) Robyx — 5:54
14. "Think About the Way" (Noche De Luna Mix) Robyx — 6:22
15. "Think About the Way" (Answering Machine Mix) Robyx — 5:34

Version Polygram distribution.

== Track listing ==
1. "It's a Rainy Day" - (Radio Version) Robyx — 4:12
2. "Labba Ling" Malatesti, Robyx, Salani, Vivaldi — 4:06
3. "Take Away the Colour" - (Radio Mix) Robyx — 3:25
4. "Think About the Way" Robyx — 4:16
5. "Look After Nature" Malatesti, Robyx, Salani, Vivaldi — 3:50
6. "Run Fa Cover" Malatesti, Robyx, Salani, Vivaldi — 4:37
7. "Russian Roulette" Malatesti, Robyx, Salani, Vivaldi — 4:23
8. "The Britaican" Malatesti, Robyx, Salani, Vivaldi — 3:20
9. "Dark Night Rider" Malatesti, Robyx, Salani, Vivaldi — 4:09
10. "It's a Rainy Day" (happyman radio mix)" Robyx — 3:23
11. "Funkin' With You" Robyx — 3:25
12. "Afrikan Buzz" Robyx — 3:50
13. "Think About the Way" Robyx — 5:54
14. "Easy" Robyx — 3:44
15. "Cinema" Robyx — 3:46

== Credits ==
- Engineered by Francesco Alberti
- Arranged and produced by Robyx
- Vocals by Ian Campbell and Alexia

== Charts ==
Chart (1994)	Peak position
Austrian Albums Chart	34
Finnish Albums Chart	4
French SNEP Albums Chart	5
German Albums Chart	41
Hungarian Albums (MAHASZ)	14
Swedish Albums Chart	31
Swiss Albums Chart	31

== Certifications ==
Region	Certification	Certified units/sales
France (SNEP)	Gold	100,000^{*}
^{*} Sales figures based on certification alone.
