= Any Colour =

Single by Cutting Crew

from the album Broadcast
- B-side: "Fear of Falling"
- Released: 1987
- Length: 4:54
- Label: Virgin
- Songwriters: Nick Van Eede; Kevin MacMichael
- Producers: Cutting Crew; Terry Brown

Cutting Crew singles chronology
"One for the Mockingbird" (1987)	"Any Colour" (1987)	"(Between a) Rock and a Hard Place" (1989)

"Any Colour" is a song by the English rock band Cutting Crew, released in 1987 as the fourth and final single from their 1986 debut album, Broadcast.

== Background and composition ==
About "Any Colour", songwriter Nick Van Eede said:

That is the song where things clicked for us. Everything that took five days previously would take about ten minutes. Kevin, our founding member with me, who is sadly no longer with us, flew in from Halifax, Nova Scotia to be with Terry Brown in his studio in Toronto. Terry, the Rush producer, was already my mate. The session really worked. Nick had this beautiful guitar part and said that is all he had, and I came up with another part. We wrote it in twenty minutes, and it became our first demo. We really didn’t change much of it when we recorded it properly, later. The song is about people who click. Kevin had no ego. When you make music together, that is the biggest elephant in the room, when somebody says, “It’s okay, but I prefer my idea.” Then you just go around in circles."

== Chart performance ==
"Any Colour" reached No. 83 on the UK Singles Chart.

== Charts ==
Chart (1987)	Peak position
UK Singles Chart	83
