= Broadcast (Cutting Crew album) =

- Standard vinyl edition

Studio album by Cutting Crew
- Released: 14 November 1986
- Recorded: February–July 1986
- Studio: Mediasound, New York City, US; AIR, London, UK; Comforts Place, Surrey, UK; Utopia, London, UK
- Genre: Rock; pop rock; soft rock; new wave
- Length: 48:33
- Label: Virgin; Siren
- Producer: Cutting Crew; Michael Barbiero; Steve Thompson; John Jansen; Terry Brown

Cutting Crew chronology
Broadcast (1986)	The Scattering (1989)

US edition

Singles from Broadcast
- 1. "(I Just) Died in Your Arms" Released: July 1986; 2. "I've Been in Love Before" Released: October 1986; 3. "One for the Mockingbird" Released: February 1987; 4. "Any Colour" Released: May 1987

Professional ratings
Review scores
Source	Rating
AllMusic	4/5 stars

Broadcast is the debut studio album by the English rock band Cutting Crew. It was first released in the United Kingdom in November 1986, and was later released more widely, including in the United States, Canada and Japan in March 1987 with different packaging and four remixed tracks ("Any Colour", "One for the Mockingbird", "I've Been in Love Before" and "(I Just) Died in Your Arms"), all of which were released as singles. It was the first album to be released in the US by Virgin Records' new American imprint, Virgin Records America.

Broadcast was re-released by Cherry Red Records on 24 May 2010, with bonus tracks including for the first time on CD "For the Longest Time", the B-side of "(I Just) Died in Your Arms".

== Critical reception ==
"(I Just) Died in Your Arms" reached No. 1 on the US Billboard Hot 100 and No. 4 on the UK Singles Chart, and later on, "I've Been in Love Before" and "One for the Mockingbird" became top 10 and top 40 hits respectively across various countries. The band then received a Grammy nomination for Best New Artist of 1987. Despite all this, however, contemporary reception to the album was mixed from critics and muted commercially.

Both the album and the band have been looked upon more positively in hindsight. In a retrospective review, Michael Sutton of AllMusic gave the album four stars. He said the album "never deserved the hacking [it] received from critics", and said that "the slick guitar rock on Broadcast may not have wowed the rock & roll intelligentsia, but it's a guaranteed crowd-pleaser, an underrated collection of simple, heartfelt love songs and up-tempo pop that reside between the stylistic boundaries of new wave and mainstream rock." He concludes the review by saying the album "is not a creative breakthrough", but is "simply an LP absent of any filler."

In the early 1990s, the first seven tracks were included in the compilation album The Best of Cutting Crew, along with select songs from the follow-up studio album The Scattering (1989) and the single "If That's the Way You Want It" from Compus Mentus (1992). The band's second compilation album, Ransomed Healed Restored Forgiven, released in 2020, features orchestral versions of the four singles spanned from Broadcast, plus the title track, this one in a version half the length of the original incarnation.

== Track listing ==
1. "Any Colour" (Nick Van Eede, Kevin Scott MacMichael) – 4:57
2. "One for the Mockingbird" (Van Eede) – 4:23
3. "I've Been in Love Before" (Van Eede) – 5:09
4. "Life in a Dangerous Time" (Van Eede) – 4:34
5. "Fear of Falling" (Van Eede, MacMichael) – 4:50
6. "(I Just) Died in Your Arms" (Van Eede) – 4:39
7. "Don't Look Back" (Van Eede, MacMichael) – 4:12
8. "Sahara" (Steve Boorer; Van Eede) – 4:49
9. "It Shouldn't Take Too Long" (Van Eede, MacMichael, Colin Farley, Martin Beedle, Mac Norman) – 4:05
10. "The Broadcast" (Van Eede, Chris Townsend) – 6:33

=== Remastered and expanded version ===
1. "Any Colour" (USA Mix) – 4:58
2. "One for the Mockingbird" (USA Mix) – 4:27
3. "I've Been in Love Before" – 5:32
4. "Life in a Dangerous Time" – 4:36
5. "Fear of Falling" – 4:55
6. "(I Just) Died in Your Arms (USA Mix)" – 4:46
7. "Don't Look Back" – 4:11
8. "Sahara" – 4:52
9. "It Shouldn't Take Too Long" – 4:05
10. "The Broadcast" – 6:39
11. "(I Just) Died in Your Arms" (12" Mix) – 6:46
12. "I've Been in Love Before" (Live in London) – 5:16
13. "The Broadcast"/"Any Colour" (Live in the USA) – 8:03
14. "For the Longest Time" – 4:29

== Personnel ==
Cutting Crew

- Nick Van Eede – lead vocals, rhythm guitars, keyboards
- Kevin MacMichael – E-mu Emulator, lead guitars, backing vocals
- Colin Farley – bass guitar, keyboards, backing vocals
- Martin ‘Frosty’ Beedle – drums, percussion, backing vocals

Additional personnel

- Peter-John Vettese – sequencing (1), keyboards (2, 4–10)
- Pete Adams – sequencing (2, 9)
- David LeBolt – keyboards (3)
- Pete Woodroffe – Fairlight CMI (9, 10)
- Chris Townsend – bass (4)
- Jimmy Maelen – percussion (3)
- Gary Barnacle – saxophone (7, 8)
- The Elephant and Castle Yob Choir – backing vocals (5)
- Peter Birch – backing vocals (6)

Production

- Cutting Crew – producers (1, 2, 4–10)
- Terry Brown – producer (1, 2, 4–10), engineer (1, 2, 4–10), mixing (2, 7)
- Michael Barbiero – producer (3), engineer (3), mixing (3)
- Steve Thompson – producer (3), engineer (3), mixing (3)
- John Jansen – producer (6)
- Tony Taverner – mixing (4)
- Phil Brown – mixing (7)
- Tim Palmer – remixing (1, 5, 6, 8–10)
- Denis Blackham – mastering
- Bill Smith Studio – cover design
- Dirk Van Dooren – illustration
- Malcolm Heywood – group photography

== Singles ==
- "(I Just) Died in Your Arms" – #1 US Billboard Hot 100, #4 UK Singles Chart
- "One for the Mockingbird" – #38 US Billboard Hot 100, #52 UK Singles Chart
- "I've Been in Love Before" – #9 US Billboard Hot 100, #2 US Billboard Adult Contemporary, #24 UK Singles Chart
- "Any Colour" – #83 UK Singles Chart

== Charts ==
=== Weekly charts ===
Weekly chart performance for Broadcast
Chart (1986–1987)	Peak position
Australian Albums (Kent Music Report)	77
German Albums (Offizielle Top 100)	49
Norwegian Albums (VG-lista)	3
Swedish Albums (Sverigetopplistan)	30
UK Albums (Official Charts)	41
US Billboard 200	16

=== Year-end charts ===
Year-end chart performance for Broadcast
Chart (1987)	Position
US Billboard 200	71

== Certifications and sales ==
Certifications and sales for Broadcast
Region	Certification	Certified units/sales
Canada (Music Canada)	Gold	50,000^{^}
Finland (Musiikkituottajat)	Gold	25,000
United Kingdom (BPI)	Silver	60,000^{^}
United States (RIAA)	Gold	500,000^{^}
^{^} Shipments figures based on certification alone.
