= Easy (Ice MC song) =

Single by Ice MC

from the album Cinema
- B-side: "Rock Your Body"
- Released: 1989
- Studio: Casablanca Recordings
- Genre: Euro House; hip-house
- Length: 3:40
- Label: ZYX Records
- Songwriter: Roberto Zanetti
- Producer: Roberto Zanetti

Ice MC singles chronology
"Easy" (1989)	"Scream" (1990)

Music video
- "Easy" on YouTube

"Easy" is a song by Italy-based British Eurodance rapper Ice MC. It features vocals by German singer Jasmin Heinrich and was also his first single, produced and written by Italian music producer and composer Roberto Zanetti (credited as Robyx). Released in 1989 by ZYX Records as the lead single from his debut album, Cinema (1990), the song enjoyed success all over Europe, reaching number two in Spain, number three in West Germany, and the top 5 in Italy and Switzerland. In the US, "Easy" peaked at number four on MTV's Video Rap Chart. There were produced two different versions of the music video for the song; the latter version was directed by Jessica and filmed in New York, the US. It features dancers Stretch and Peter Paul.

== Critical reception ==
Bill Coleman from Billboard magazine wrote, "First strains of influence by Milli Vanilli's chart dominance are felt on this pop-slanted rap track." David Giles from Music Week described it as a "pleasant rap/soul collaboration, and in places there is even a hint of reggae toasting in the vocals." He added, "Lyrically it appears to be an opportunity to namecheck all Ice's favourite musical styles and artists, but cryptic enough to keep us guessing." Mark Dezzani from pan-European magazine Music & Media named it "a slow rap with a female vocal refrain".

A reviewer from The Network Forty commented, "Imagine a rap song produced by David Foster, featuring lapses of Jeffrey Osborne balladering, while Maddy Hayes' secretary murmurs 'Real Intellectual Muscle' throughout and you have this innovative new crossover record." Tom Doyle from Smash Hits complimented the song as "a good rap record which sounds very mean 'n' tough in the verses and a bit like Milli Vanilli in the choruses. Very singable and happy."

== Track listing ==
- 7" single, UK (1989)
1. "Easy"
2. "Rock Your Body"
- 12" single, UK (1990)
1. "Easy" (Extended Revolution Mix) — 5:35
2. "Easy" (Radio Version) — 3:40
3. "Easy" (Attack Mix) — 6:35
4. "Rock Your Body" — 3:56
- CD maxi, UK (1990)
1. "Easy" (Radio Version) — 3:45
2. "Easy" (Extended Revolution Mix) — 5:43
3. "Easy" (Attack Mix) — 6:36
4. "Rock Your Body" — 3:56

== Charts ==
=== Weekly charts ===
Chart (1989–1990)	Peak position
Australia (ARIA)	157
Austria (Ö3 Austria Top 40)	7
Europe (Eurochart Hot 100)	18
France (SNEP)	17
France (French Singles Chart)	8
Spain (AFYVE)	2
Switzerland (Schweizer Hitparade)	4
West Germany (GfK)	3

=== Monthly charts ===
Chart (2025)	Peak position
Russia Streaming (TopHit)	95
