= Music for Money =

Single by Ice MC

from the album Dreadatour
- B-side: "Remix"
- Released: 9 September 1996
- Studio: Session Studios
- Genre: Eurodance; ragga
- Length: 3:27
- Label: Club Zone
- Songwriters: Ian Campbell; Joker Three
- Producer: Masterboy

Ice MC singles chronology
| "Give Me the Light" (1996) | "Music for Money" (1996) | "Let's Take It Easy" (1997) |

Music video
- "Music for Money" on YouTube

"Music for Money" is a song recorded by British, Italy based Eurodance artist Ice MC, featuring vocals by Italian singer Valentina Ducros, who also appeared on "Give Me the Light". Produced by German Eurodance project Masterboy, it was released in 1996, by Club Zone, as the second single from Ice MC's fourth album, Dreadatour (1996). "Music for Money" was successful in the Czech Republic and Finland, where it peaked at numbers eight and 12. The accompanying music video was directed by Stephan Hadjam, produced by Ulli Beyer and filmed in Berlin, Germany. Pan-European magazine Music & Media wrote in their review of the single, "Ice MC sings raggamuffin' style over dance beats. He should be praised for the honest lyrical content. The second, more clubby radio cut, has slightly more potential than the first."

== Track listing ==
- 12" single, Germany
1. "Music for Money" (Maxi Club Mix) — 5:42
2. "Music for Money" (Maxi MB Mellow Mix) — 5:38
3. "Music for Money" (Static Mix) — 5:29
- 12" maxi, France
1. "Music for Money" (Funky Mix) — 4:17
2. "Music for Money" (Masterboy Remix) — 5:42
3. "Music for Money" (Cash Mix) — 5:55
- CD single, Europe
1. "Music for Money" (Single Version) — 3:25
2. "Music for Money" (Radio Remix) — 4:23
- CD maxi, Europe
1. "Music for Money" (Single Version) — 3:27
2. "Music for Money" (Radio Cut) — 3:22
3. "Music for Money" (Maxi Club Mix) — 5:40
4. "Music for Money" (Static Mix) — 5:32
5. "Music for Money" (Maxi MB Mellow Mix) — 5:33

== Charts ==
| Chart (1996) | Peak position |
|---|---|
| Czech Republic (IFPI CR) | 8 |
| Finland (Suomen virallinen lista) | 12 |
