= (I Just) Died in Your Arms =

1986 single by Cutting Crew

- UK single cover

Single by Cutting Crew

from the album Broadcast
- B-side: "For the Longest Time"
- Released: July 1986
- Recorded: 1986
- Genre: Synth-rock; new wave; progressive rock
- Length: 4:39
- Label: Virgin
- Songwriter: Nick Van Eede
- Producers: Terry Brown; John Jansen; Cutting Crew

Cutting Crew singles chronology
"(I Just) Died in Your Arms" (1986)	"I've Been in Love Before" (1986)

Music video
- "(I Just) Died in Your Arms" on YouTube

"(I Just) Died in Your Arms" is the debut single by English rock band Cutting Crew, from their first album, Broadcast (1986). The song was written by lead vocalist Nick Van Eede, who was inspired by a phrase he uttered while having sex with his ex-girlfriend. It is a power ballad that incorporates elements of synth-rock, new wave, and progressive rock. The lyrics use the concept of la petite mort to depict a man's internal conflict: experiencing orgasm while feeling emotionally overwhelmed, knowing he should leave the relationship but finding himself unable to walk away.

The single was first released in the United Kingdom by Siren Records, a subsidiary of Virgin Records, in the summer of 1986; Virgin released it in the United States on 6 February 1987. Two music videos were produced for the respective markets. "(I Just) Died in Your Arms" achieved global commercial success, reaching number one in 16 countries, including Canada and Finland. In the United States, the single topped the Billboard Hot 100 for two weeks, becoming the first number one for both Cutting Crew and Virgin Records. In the United Kingdom, the song peaked at number four on the UK Singles Chart.

"(I Just) Died in Your Arms" received mixed reviews on its release. Some critics praised its melody and production, while others criticised the track for being unoriginal. It became Cutting Crew's signature song, and its commercial success cemented the band's status as a 1980s one-hit wonder. The song has been featured in numerous films, video games, and television programmes, such as Grand Theft Auto: Vice City, The Lego Batman Movie, and Stranger Things. It has also been covered or sampled by other artists.

== Background and production ==
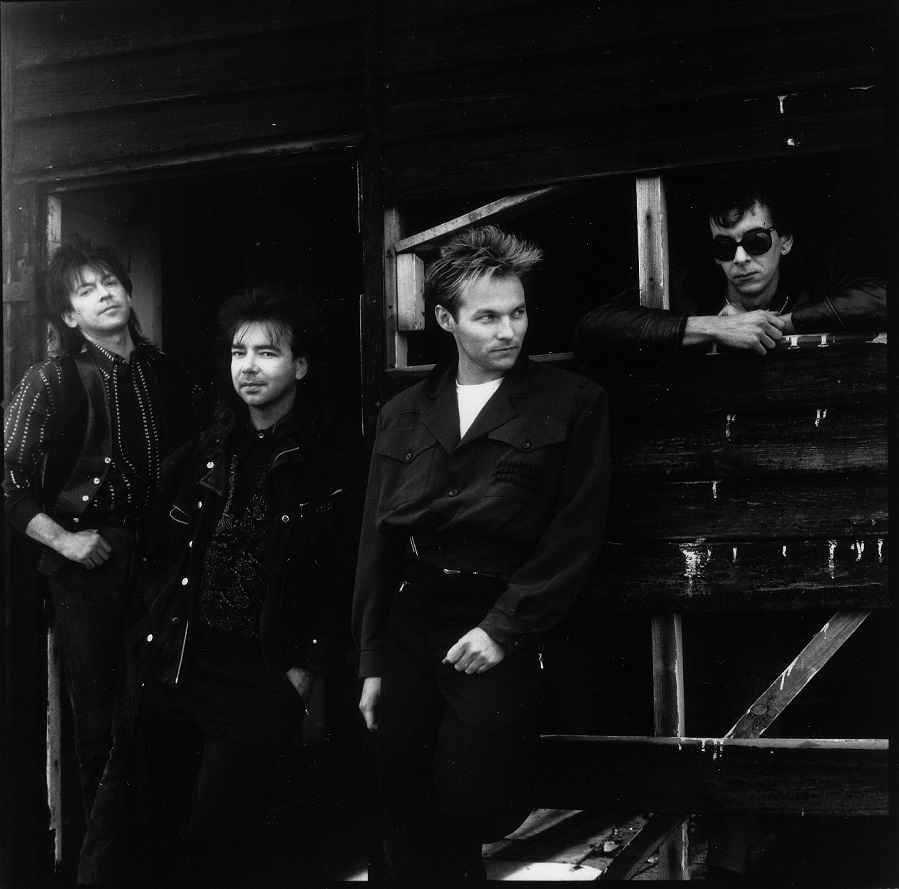
Cutting Crew in 1989. Nick Van Eede (third from the left) came up with the idea for the song based on his experience of a sexual relationship with his ex-girlfriend.

Before forming the rock band Cutting Crew, lead vocalist Nick Van Eede had pursued a solo career and released singles, though he failed to achieve significant success. While touring Canada with his band the Drivers, Van Eede met guitarist Kevin MacMichael of the band Fast Forward and proposed a collaboration. Following the dissolution of their former bands, they relocated to London in 1985 to work together. There, they recruited bassist Colin Farley and drummer Martin "Frosty" Beedle to form Cutting Crew. The group began writing songs for their debut studio album, Broadcast, including "(I Just) Died in Your Arms". Cassettes of these demos were sent to record companies, securing the band a contract with Siren Records, a subsidiary of Virgin Records.

The concept for "(I Just) Died in Your Arms" originated from Van Eede's night of sex with his ex-girlfriend. At that moment, he uttered the phrase "I just died in your arms tonight" and immediately wrote it in his notebook. The following morning, he used this phrase as the inspiration to title and compose the song. The lyrics were completed the next day, and a demo was produced on a four-track recorder within two days. Van Eede later described his demo arrangement of the guitar and keyboards as "bad", because his focus had been primarily on the vocals. The studio recording for "(I Just) Died in Your Arms" required three attempts to achieve a result that satisfied Van Eede. Following unsuccessful recording efforts in New York City and the United Kingdom, he enlisted producer Terry Brown to fly from Toronto to London to assist with the track.

Brown played the drum part, using a Ludwig Black Beauty snare drum from musician Neil Peart. MacMichael performed the guitar solo, while the backing vocals were provided by Pete Birch, Van Eede's landlord from his early career. Birch completed his vocal recording in a single take lasting five minutes. Van Eede attempted to process Birch's recording by overdubbing approximately eight tracks of guitar himself, resulting in a "lush cacophony", and MacMichael assisted in removing an unsuitable guitar layer. On the final day of mixing, Van Eede lowered the tempo to reduce the pop influence and bring out the rock character of the song. An audio engineer sampled a snare drum sound and overdubbed it onto Brown's original audio to create a sonic signature typical of the 1980s.

In early 1987, while preparing for the United States release, Richard Branson, the co-founder of Virgin Records, requested that "(I Just) Died in Your Arms" be remixed to better suit US radio stations. Cutting Crew went to A&M Studios in Hollywood to work with engineer Shelly Yakus. After four days, Yakus produced a final mix with boosted snare drums and bass. Cutting Crew produced two music videos. The first, released in the UK, focused on the band's performance on a soundstage, showing Van Eede in a long coat. The second version, released in the US, employed a split-screen style, using shadow and grain effects within a black-and-white palette, interspersed with artistic images of models.

== Music and lyrics ==
"(I Just) Died in Your Arms" is a power ballad incorporating synth-rock, new wave, and progressive rock, characterised by a spiralling guitar. Tom Breihan of Stereogum described the arrangement as "dramatic" and "sparkly", highlighting the pulsing "synth-hiccups" and MacMichael's new wave-influenced guitar riff, which he called "splintered" and "evocative". He also noted the inclusion of the cello and the "boom" of the drums. Van Eede delivers the song with a "smoky" vocal tone. In the chorus, he expresses emotion through high-pitched, drawn-out notes on the words "I" and "died", creating a sense of "need" and "urgency". Breihan commented that Van Eede's delivery contrasts with the lyrics; rather than sounding like someone who "should have walked away", he sounds as though he "can't wait to make that mistake again".

The structure of "(I Just) Died in Your Arms" creates a contrast between its understated verses and an emotionally intense chorus. The intro, choruses, guitar solo, and outro use a Bm–Em–Asus^{4}–A–F♯sus^{4} chord progression. The guitar bridge, appearing after the first and second choruses, uses a Bm–Bm–B^{7}sus^{4} progression. In the verses, the chords follow a Bm–Gmaj^{9}–Asus^{4}–F♯sus^{4} sequence, while the bridge shifts to a simpler G–Em^{9} progression. The line "I just died in your arms tonight", which recurs throughout the choruses, was described by Van Eede as a "killer melody". He attributed the song's success to the title line "hitting a chord" with listeners, commenting that most people have "died in somebody's arms" at some point in their lives and can relate to the sentiment.

According to Van Eede, "(I Just) Died in Your Arms" contains multiple layers of meaning, revolving around a man's internal struggle against the potent allure of love: experiencing orgasm alongside helplessness, and finding it difficult to let go despite knowing he should. The song conveys that one should not reconcile after a breakup, even after a passionate night. The song employs death as a metaphor for being lovesick and for sexual pleasure, paralleling the French concept of la petite mort. In the first chorus, Van Eede delivers emphatic vocals combined with a choir, emphasising the line "Ah! I just died in your arms tonight!" to evoke the sensation of death in a lover's arms during climax. The verses depict a reflection from a young man who allowed instinct to lead him into a sexual relationship, only to face heartbreak. He describes himself as a hopeless naïf unable to resist his lover's charm: "Who would've thought that a boy like me could come to this?" Van Eede said "there's a lot of guilt because I should have kept my distance".

== Release and chart performance ==
Before release, Virgin objected to the parentheses in the song title but relented after a staff member referred to "(I Can't Get No) Satisfaction" (1965) by the Rolling Stones. In the United Kingdom, "(I Just) Died in Your Arms" was released via Siren Records. According to Music Week, the track began appearing on radio charts during the week of 19 July 1986. In early August 1986, Siren continued to promote the single to radio stations across Europe. In the United States, "(I Just) Died in Your Arms" was released as a 12-inch single by Virgin Records and serviced to radio on 6 February 1987. This was the first Virgin recording to be issued in the country. The US-version music video began airing on MTV during the week of 11 February 1987.

As of November 1987, "(I Just) Died in Your Arms" had reached number one on music charts in 16 countries. In the United Kingdom, Cutting Crew's home country, the song peaked at number 4 on the UK Singles Chart for the week of 14 September 1986. In the United States, the track topped the Billboard Hot 100 for the week ending 2 May 1987, driven by widespread airplay on 227 out of 229 reporting stations and a high sales volume, which brought the song to number 4 on the Hot 100 Sales chart. This was the first number-one single for Cutting Crew in the US and the first chart-topper for Virgin Records since establishing its US branch. In the same week, "(I Just) Died in Your Arms" also led Billboard's Hot 100 Airplay chart and the Top 100 Pop Singles chart by Cash Box. The following week, the song maintained its lead on both the Hot 100 and Hot 100 Airplay, while climbing to number 2 on Hot 100 Sales. In subsequent weeks, it rose to the top of the singles charts for The Record and RPM in Canada.

== Critical reception ==
"(I Just) Died in Your Arms" received mixed reviews from contemporary music critics. On the positive side, Pam Brooks of WPDH in Poughkeepsie, New York, praised the song for possessing an "infectious" sound that entranced listeners. In a review for USA Today, John Milward characterised the song as an "attractive hit" and the highlight of Broadcast. He complimented the arrangement, "smart" lyrics, and Van Eede's powerful vocals. Sharing this view, Gerry O'Shea of 2Day FM (Australia) selected it as the album's standout track and lauded its production as "beautifully arranged". Alan Poole of the Northamptonshire Evening Telegraph described the track as a "clean-cut" melodic rock song with "impressive" vocals, while a reviewer from the Newark Advertiser remarked that the production was perfect, with clear sound and "goosepimple"-raising guitar breaks.

The song faced criticism for lacking originality and having clichéd content. J. D. Considine, writing for Rolling Stone, derided "(I Just) Died in Your Arms" as a "pallid" imitation of the "pompous" synth-pop style of the band Asia. He stated that if this was Cutting Crew's "masterstroke", the band's overall musical quality must be poor. John Lee of the Huddersfield Daily Examiner dismissed the song as a meaningless, outdated concoction lacking identity, resembling a clumsy simulation of old rock genres or a "popified" version of the band Yes. Ralph Kisiel of The Blade considered the track average compared to the rest of Broadcast, while Andy Glitre of Countdown Magazine simply described the song as "ghastly". Ethlie Ann Vare of the Philadelphia Daily News panned the song, calling it "drippy", undeserving of the number-one spot, and an insult to rock and roll, even expressing a desire to "consign the record to the waste bin". Regarding the US music video, she lambasted the production as "horrid", citing its abuse of sexual imagery and offence to women, and writing that it should be confined "to the porno house".

== Live performances and media usages ==
To promote "(I Just) Died in Your Arms", Cutting Crew made appearances on music programmes such as the BBC's Top of the Pops and TopPop (Netherlands), and performed at diverse venues ranging from Shelley's Laserdome nightclub (Longton, Staffordshire) to the Adventure Island water park (Tampa, Florida). They also served as the opening act for various artists, such as singer and actor Huey Lewis at the Pacific Amphitheatre (Orange County, California), and joined tours with bands like Starship and The Bangles. During the world tour promoting Broadcast, Cutting Crew performed the song in numerous countries, including Canada, Thailand, Japan, China, and Taiwan. By November 1987, they had performed the song at over 200 concerts.

"(I Just) Died in Your Arms" has been sampled in songs such as "Relax, Take It Easy" (2006) by British singer Mika, "Puller Return" (2010) by American indie singer Gregory and the Hawk, and "Te Espero" (2022) by American singer Prince Royce and Argentine singer María Becerra. The song has been covered by Canadian singer Joée (1995), American singer Kelly Clarkson (2023), and the British indie pop band Bastille (2023). It was also referenced in the song "SOS" (2006) by Barbadian singer Rihanna. In 2020, the snack brand Planters used the song in a Super Bowl LIV commercial featuring the "death" of their mascot, Mr. Peanut. The song appears in the action-adventure video game Grand Theft Auto: Vice City (2002) on the fictional radio station Emotion 98.3. It was also made available for the rhythm game Rock Band 3 (2010) in August 2012.

"(I Just) Died in Your Arms" has been featured in films such as the romantic comedy Never Been Kissed (1999), the comedy Hot Rod (2007), the sci-fi comedy Hot Tub Time Machine (2010), the animated superhero comedy The Lego Batman Movie (2017), the comedy-drama Blinded by the Light (2019), and the romantic comedy Love Hard (2021). In television, the track has featured in the crime procedural Cold Case season 4 (2006), the comedy-horror Ash vs Evil Dead (2016), the sci-fi series Stranger Things season 3 (2019) and season 5 (2025), the urban fantasy Lucifer season 6 (2021), the teen drama Euphoria season 2 (2022), the teaser trailer and an episode of the crime drama A Town Called Malice (2023), and the reality competition The Traitors season 2 (2024).

== Legacy ==
Within two weeks of its US debut, "(I Just) Died in Your Arms" caused a sensation. Jeffrey Naumann, vice president of Virgin, stated that listeners were constantly calling the label and radio stations to demand increased airplay. The instant success of the song upended Cutting Crew's original schedule, forcing them to work quickly with the label on promotion and tour planning. Dennis Hunt of the Los Angeles Times attributed this phenomenon to a perfect convergence of three elements: heartbreak lyrics that resonated with young people, the good looks of the band members, and a bold music video that received heavy rotation on MTV. He also wrote that with the song's success, lead singer Nick Van Eede became "swoon bait", describing him as having a "suave" appearance and sex appeal.

"(I Just) Died in Your Arms" remains Cutting Crew's most successful single, largely overshadowing the band's other work. Even "I've Been in Love Before", which Rolling Stone called their second hit, failed to achieve similar status and was soon forgotten. In 2009, VH1 ranked Cutting Crew at number 26 on its list of the 100 greatest one-hit wonders of the 1980s. Van Eede said the song was a "burden" that made it difficult for the band to move beyond it, yet he eventually learned to appreciate it. He views the hit as a "passport" and "business card", which has helped maintain the band's income and opened opportunities to tour internationally for decades.

"(I Just) Died in Your Arms" was banned from broadcast by the BBC during the Gulf War (from 2 August 1990 to 28 February 1991). Cutting Crew included the song on their first compilation, The Best of Cutting Crew (1993). In 2020, the band released an orchestral reimagining of "(I Just) Died in Your Arms" on their album Ransomed Healed Restored Forgiven. The track was simultaneously issued as an eight-track extended play (EP) in both physical and digital formats.

== Track listings ==
- 7" single
1. "(I Just) Died in Your Arms" – 4:39
2. "For the Longest Time" – 4:39
- 12" single
1. "(I Just) Died in Your Arms" (12" mix) – 6:47
2. "(I Just) Died in Your Arms" – 4:39
3. "For the Longest Time" – 4:39
- Japanese 7" single
1. "(I Just) Died in Your Arms" – 4:39
2. "I've Been in Love Before" – 4:29
- Mini-CD single
1. "(I Just) Died in Your Arms" (Shelly Yakus US remix) – 4:41
2. "One for the Mockingbird" (Shelly Yakus US remix) – 4:23
3. "Any Colour (Just for You)" (live recording) – 4:57
4. "(I Just) Died in Your Arms" (7" version) – 4:38
- EP 2020
1. "(I Just) Died in Your Arms" (orchestral version) – 5:29
2. "(I Just) Died in Your Arms" (extended orchestral version) – 8:09
3. "(I Just) Died in Your Arms" (orchestra and guitar version) – 5:25
4. "(I Just) Died in Your Arms" (orchestra and vocal version) – 5:25
5. "(I Just) Died in Your Arms" (main version) – 4:25
6. "(I Just) Died in Your Arms" (extended orchestral instrumental) – 8:09
7. "(I Just) Died in Your Arms (reprise)" (orchestra and guitar version) – 1:58
8. "(I Just) Died in Your Arms" (main instrumental) – 4:25

== Charts ==
=== Weekly charts ===
Chart (1986–1987)	Peak position
Australia (Kent Music Report)	8
Austria (Ö3 Austria Top 40)	9
Belgium (Ultratop 50 Flanders)	17
Canada Retail Singles (The Record)	1
Canada Top Singles (RPM)	1
Canada Adult Contemporary (RPM)	11
Europe (European Hot 100 Singles)	20
Finland (Suomen virallinen lista)	1
Ireland (IRMA)	2
Netherlands (Dutch Top 40)	9
Netherlands (Single Top 100)	16
New Zealand (Recorded Music NZ)	50
Norway (VG-lista)	1
South Africa (Springbok Radio)	4
Sweden (Sverigetopplistan)	2
Switzerland (Schweizer Hitparade)	4
UK Singles (Official Charts)	4
US Billboard Hot 100	1
US Album Rock Tracks (Billboard)	4
US Adult Contemporary (Billboard)	24
US Dance/Disco Club Play (Billboard)	37
US Cash Box Top 100	1
West Germany (GfK)	4

Chart (2017)	Peak position
Poland Airplay (ZPAV)	42

Chart (2026)	Peak position
Greece International (IFPI)	57

=== Year-end charts ===
Chart (1986)	Position
Australia (Kent Music Report)	94
Europe (European Hot 100 Singles)	100
UK Singles (OCC)	44

Chart (1987)	Position
Australia (Australian Music Report)	90
Canada Top Singles (RPM)	7
US Billboard Hot 100	32
US Cash Box Top 100	31

== Certifications ==
Region	Certification	Certified units/sales
Canada (Music Canada)	Platinum	80,000^{‡}
Denmark (IFPI Danmark)	Platinum	90,000^{‡}
Germany (BVMI)	Gold	250,000^{‡}
Italy (FIMI)	Gold	50,000^{‡}
New Zealand (RMNZ)	2× Platinum	60,000^{‡}
Spain (Promusicae)	Gold	30,000^{‡}
United Kingdom (BPI)	Platinum	600,000^{‡}
Streaming
Greece (IFPI Greece)	Platinum	2,000,000^{†}
^{‡} Sales+streaming figures based on certification alone.^{†} Streaming-only figures based on certification alone.
