= One for the Mockingbird =

"One for the Mocking-Bird"

Single by Cutting Crew

from the album Broadcast
- B-side: "Mirror and a Blade (live)"
- Released: 1987
- Length: 3:58
- Label: Virgin
- Songwriter: Nick Van Eede
- Producers: Cutting Crew, Terry Brown

Cutting Crew singles chronology
"I've Been in Love Before" (1986)	"One for the Mocking-Bird" (1987)	"Any Colour" (1987)

"One for the Mockingbird" (also titled "One for the Mocking-Bird" in some editions) is a song by the English rock band Cutting Crew. It was released in 1987 as the third single from their first studio album, Broadcast. The song was written by the band's lead vocalist, Nick Van Eede.

"One for the Mockingbird" is known for its catchy melody and introspective lyrics, which touch upon themes of longing, loneliness, and the search for connection. The mockingbird in the title and lyrics symbolizes a messenger or a guide, leading the singer through the emotional landscape of the song.

The song was moderately successful, reaching the top 40 in several countries, including the United States, where it peaked at number 38 on the Billboard Hot 100 chart. It also received significant airplay on radio stations and music television channels at the time of its release.

Despite not achieving the same level of commercial success as their previous hit single "(I Just) Died in Your Arms", "One for the Mockingbird" remains a favorite among fans of Cutting Crew and is often remembered as one of their standout tracks.

== Charts ==
Chart (1987)	Peak position
Australian Chart	96
Belgium Chart	40
Canada Singles Chart	47
UK Singles (OCC)	52
US Billboard Hot 100	38
