= Scream (Ice MC song) =

1990 single by Ice MC

Single by Ice MC

from the album Cinema
- B-side: "Remix"
- Released: 1990
- Studio: Casablanca Recordings
- Genre: Euro House; hip-house
- Length: 4:02
- Label: ZYX Records
- Songwriter: Roberto Zanetti
- Producer: Roberto Zanetti

Ice MC singles chronology
"Easy" (1989)	"Scream" (1990)	"Take Away the Colour" (1993)

Music video
- "Scream" on YouTube

"Scream" is a song by British, Italy-based Eurodance artist Ice MC. It was released in 1990, by ZYX Records, and features vocals by Italian singer Alexia. The song is produced by Italian music producer and composer Roberto Zanetti and screams are performed by singer Vivienne. Released as the second single from the artist's debut album, Cinema (1990), it became a top-20 hit in West Germany, peaking at number 14 with a total of 16 weeks within the German Singles Chart. The accompanying music video was directed by Giacomo De Simone.

== Track listing ==
- 7" single, Scandinavia (1990)
1. "Scream" — 4:02
2. "Scream" (The Overture) — 2:30
- 12", Italy (1990)
1. "Scream" (Extended Atomic Remix) — 6:55
2. "Scream" (The Overture) — 2:30
3. "Scream" (The Single) — 4:02
- CD maxi, Germany (1990)
1. "Scream" (Extended Zombie Remix) — 6:55
2. "Scream" (The Single) — 4:02
3. "Scream" (The Overture) — 2:30
- CD maxi (The U.S. Remix), Germany (1990)
1. "Scream" (The Break Charts Remix) — 5:15
2. "Scream" (The Subway Remix) — 6:05
3. "Scream" (The Subway Groovepella) — 3:03

== Charts ==
Chart (1990)	Peak position
Europe (Eurochart Hot 100)	70
West Germany (GfK)	14
