= It's a Rainy Day =

Single by Ice MC

from the album Ice'n'Green
- B-side: "Remix"
- Released: 30 August 1994
- Recorded: 1994
- Genre: Eurodance
- Length: 4:12
- Label: Polydor (Germany); Eternal (UK); Ariplay Records (France); Dance World Attack (Italy); 12INC (Sweden); Blanco Y Negro (Spain); Byte Records (Belgium)
- Songwriter: Roberto Zanetti
- Producer: Roberto Zanetti

Ice MC singles chronology
"Think About the Way" (1994)	"It's a Rainy Day" (1994)	"Give Me the Light" (1996)

Music video
- "It's a Rainy Day" on YouTube

"It's a Rainy Day" is a song by British, Italy based Eurodance artist Ice MC, released in August 1994 by Italian label Dance World Attack as the third single from his third album, Ice'n'Green (1994), on which it appears in two versions, and his eleventh single overall. Written and produced by Robyx (a.k.a. Roberto Zanetti), it features vocals by Italian singer Alexia. It became the most successful single of the album, reaching number-one in Italy and number two in both Belgium and Spain. The single was also released with new remixes for the Christmas holidays. Giacomo de Simone directed its accompanying music video, which was filmed in Italy with Alexia. It was played at the 2024 Paris Olympics opening ceremony.

== Chart performance ==
"It's a Rainy Day" was a hit on the charts in Europe and remains Ice MC's most successful song, alongside "Think About the Way". It peaked at number-one in Italy, where it spent three weeks atop the Musica e dischi singles chart and additionally 12 weeks inside the Italian top 5. The single entered the top 10 also in Belgium (2), Finland (9), France (6), Greece (8), the Netherlands (8) and Spain (2), as well as on the Eurochart Hot 100, where it peaked at number six in December 1994, in its tenth week on the chart. In Belgium, "It's a Rainy Day" was held off reaching the number-one position for two weeks by Rednex's "Cotton Eye Joe", while in Spain, it was kept from the top spot by Outhere Brothers' "Don't Stop (Wiggle Wiggle)".

Additionally, the song was a top-20 hit in Austria (13), Germany (14) and Switzerland (15). In the United Kingdom, it peaked at number 73 in its first week on the UK Singles Chart, on April 2, 1995. But on the UK Dance Chart, the single fared much better, reaching number 25. On the European Dance Radio Chart, the song reached number one, becoming the most-played dance song on European radio for several weeks. It ended up as number 13 on its year-end chart. Outside Europe, "It's a Rainy Day" became a top-five hit in Peru, peaked at number six on the RPM Dance/Urban chart in Canada and number 11 in Israel. The single was awarded with a silver record in France, with a sale of 132,000 units.

== Critical reception ==
A reviewer from Music Week gave "It's a Rainy Day" three out of five, writing that "this dance track has been a hit in a few European countries and uses the familiar formula of diggedy doggedy vocal over a thumping beat." James Hamilton from the Record Mirror Dance Update described it as an "Italian galloper" in his weekly dance column, DJ directory. Regarding the Christmas remix, a review published in Music & Media noted the lyrics change to "It's Christmas Day", "surprisingly turning it into a topical Eurodance single".

== Music video ==
The music video for "It's a Rainy Day" was directed by Giacomo de Simone and filmed in Castello Malaspina, Massa in Italy. Unlike "Think About the Way", also directed by de Simone, it featured Italian singer Alexia. The video was A-listed on German music television channel VIVA in November 1994. Later it was made available on YouTube in 2014, and had received more than 50 million views as of July 2025.

== Track listings ==
These are the formats and track listings of major single releases of "It's a Rainy Day".

=== Original release ===
- CD maxi - Germany, Sweden, Italy, Spain
1. "It's a Rainy Day" (radio version) — 4:12
2. "It's a Rainy Day" (euro club mix) — 6:52
3. "It's a Rainy Day" (happyman mix) — 6:30
4. "It's a Rainy Day" (happyman dub) — 5:45
5. "It's a Rainy Day" (a cappella fast) — 4:11
6. "It's a Rainy Day" (a cappella slow) — 2:20
- CD maxi - Belgium
1. "It's a Rainy Day" (radio version) — 4:12
2. "It's a Rainy Day" (euro club mix) — 6:52
3. "It's a Rainy Day" (happyman mix) — 6:30
4. "It's a Rainy Day" (happyman dub) — 5:45
- CD maxi - Lebanon
1. "It's a Rainy Day" - Lebanon, Syria (Dj Petro Club Mix) 5:00
- CD maxi - UK
1. "It's a Rainy Day" (Lee Marrow mix - UK radio edit) — 3:19
2. "It's a Rainy Day" (original radio version) — 4:12
3. "It's a Rainy Day" (Lee Marrow extended - UK edit) — 6:34
4. "It's a Rainy Day" (Jules & Skins Stormy house vocal mix) — 7:14
5. "It's a Rainy Day" (happy man mix) — 6:30
6. "It's a Rainy Day" (mad sun remix) — 5:22
7. "It's a Rainy Day" (Lee Marrow thunder remix) — 6:35
- CD maxi - Germany
1. "It's a Rainy Day" (radio version) — 4:15
2. "It's a Rainy Day" (euro club mix) — 6:55
3. "It's a Rainy Day" (happy man mix) — 6:33
4. "It's a Rainy Day" (eh - eh - mix) — 5:17
5. "It's a Rainy Day" (new extended mix) — 6:37
6. "It's a Rainy Day" (ferrari remix) — 5:47
7. "It's a Rainy Day" (mad sun remix) — 5:23
- CD single - France, Belgium
1. "It's a Rainy Day" (radio version) — 4:12
2. "It's a Rainy Day" (happyman mix) — 6:30
- CD maxi - Remixes - Italy
1. "It's a Rainy Day" (ferrari radio eemix) — 3:59
2. "It's a Rainy Day" (original radio mix) — 4:19
3. "It's a Rainy Day" (new extended remix) — 6:41
4. "It's a Rainy Day" (thunder remix) — 6:40
5. "It's a Rainy Day" (eh - eh - mix) — 5:19
6. "It's a Rainy Day" (mad sun remix) — 5:28
7. "It's a Rainy Day" (ferrari remix) — 5:49
8. "Dark Night Rider" (long version) — 6:35
- 12" maxi - Italy
1. "It's a Rainy Day" (euro club mix) — 6:52
2. "It's a Rainy Day" (radio version) — 4:12
3. "It's a Rainy Day" (happyman mix) — 6:30
4. "It's a Rainy Day" (happyman dub) — 5:45
- 12" maxi - Belgium, Germany, Spain
1. "It's a Rainy Day" (euro club mix) — 6:52
2. "It's a Rainy Day" (radio version) — 4:12
3. "It's a Rainy Day" (a cappella fast) — 4:11
4. "It's a Rainy Day" (happyman mix) — 6:30
5. "It's a Rainy Day" (happyman dub) — 5:45
6. "It's a Rainy Day" (a cappella slow) — 2:20
- 12" maxi - UK
1. "It's a Rainy Day" (Lee Marrow mix - UK extended radio edit) — 6:34
2. "It's a Rainy Day" (happy man mix) — 6:30
3. "It's a Rainy Day" (mad sun remix) — 5:22
4. "It's a Rainy Day" (Jules & Skins Stormy house vocal mix) — 7:14
5. "It's a Rainy Day" (euro club mix) — 6:52

=== Christmas remixes ===
- CD single
1. "It's a Rainy Day" (Christmas remix radio edit) — 4:38
2. "It's a Rainy Day" (Christmas remix) — 7:00
- CD maxi
1. "It's a Rainy Day" (Christmas remix radio) — 4:38
2. "It's a Rainy Day" (Christmas remix long) — 7:00
3. "It's a Rainy Day" (new extended remix) — 6:35
4. "It's a Rainy Day" (ferrari remix) — 5:43
5. "It's a Rainy Day" (thunder remix) — 6:30
6. "It's a Rainy Day" (mad sun remix) — 5:22
- 12" maxi
1. "It's a Rainy Day" (Christmas remix - long version) — 7:00
2. "Dark Night Rider" (long edit) — 6:31
3. "It's a Rainy Day" (Christmas remix - radio version) — 4:38

== Charts and sales ==
=== Weekly charts ===
Chart (1994–1995)	Peak position
Austria (Ö3 Austria Top 40)	13
Belgium (Ultratop 50 Flanders)	2
Canada Dance/Urban (RPM)	6
Europe (Eurochart Hot 100)	6
Europe (European Dance Radio)	1
Finland (Suomen virallinen lista)	9
France (SNEP)	6
Germany (GfK)	14
Greece (Pop + Rock)	8
Israel (Israeli Singles Chart)	11
Italy (Musica e dischi)	1
Netherlands (Dutch Top 40)	8
Netherlands (Single Top 100)	8
Peru (UPI)	5
Scottish Singles Sales (Official Charts)	77
Spain (AFYVE)	2
Sweden (Sverigetopplistan)	25
Switzerland (Schweizer Hitparade)	15
UK Singles (Official Charts)	73
UK Dance (Official Charts)	25
UK Club Chart (Music Week)	30
UK Pop Tip Club Chart (Music Week)	5

=== Year-end charts ===
Chart (1994)	Position
Belgium (Ultratop Flanders)	21
Europe (Eurochart Hot 100)	51
Europe (European Dance Radio)	13
France (SNEP)	38
Germany (Official German Charts)	85
Italy (Musica e dischi)	7
Netherlands (Dutch Top 40)	76
Netherlands (Single Top 100)	68

Chart (1995)	Position
Latvia (Latvijas Top 50)	148
Netherlands (Dutch Top 40)	166

=== Certifications and sales ===
Region	Certification	Certified units/sales
France (SNEP)	Silver	125,000^{*}
^{*} Sales figures based on certification alone.
