= Ice MC =

British rapper (born 1965)

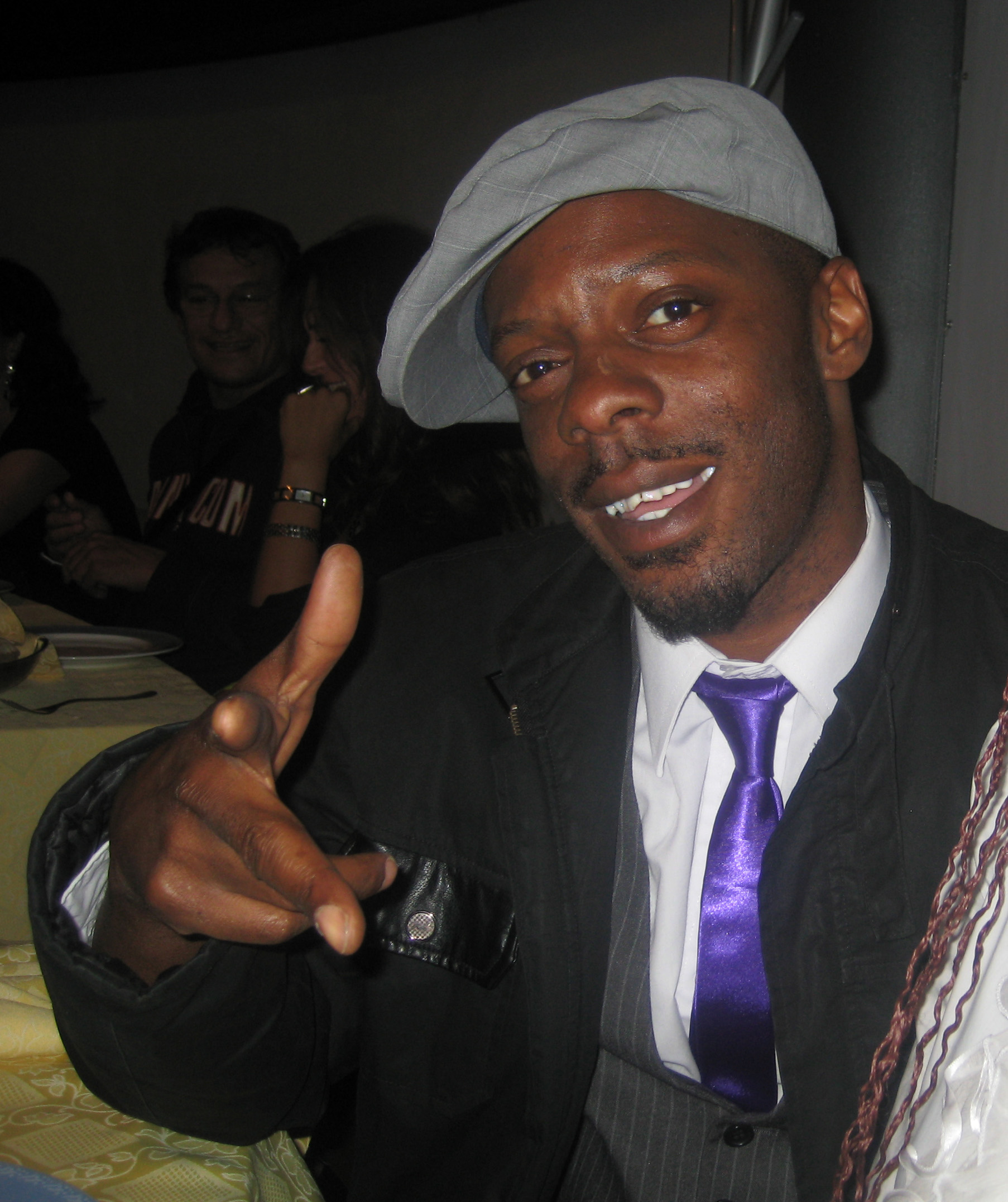
- Campbell in 2008

Background information
- Born: Ian Colin Campbell; 22 March 1965 (age 61); Hyson Green, Nottingham, United Kingdom
- Origin: Italy
- Genres: Eurodance, electronic, hip hop
- Occupations: Rapper, songwriter
- Years active: 1989–present
- Labels: DWA, Polydor

Ian Colin Campbell (born 22 March 1965), better known as Ice MC, is a British rapper who started his professional music career in Italy, when he got a record deal signing to record producer and singer Savage and released his debut single "Easy" in 1989. He's best known for the Eurodance 1990s hit singles "Take Away the Colour", "Think About the Way" and "It's a Rainy Day". Ice MC singles are most notable for being the first Eurodance songs to blend raggamuffin rapping style with female singing choruses. Zanetti's music team produced Ice MC hits while also producing songs for other major Italian artists of the same decade, like Double You, Alexia, and Corona.

== Early life ==
Ian Colin Campbell was born on 22 March 1965 in Nottingham, England, to Jamaican immigrant parents. He grew up in the Hyson Green area of Nottingham. During high school, he earned the nickname "Ice" from his initials "IC," which later evolved into "Ice MC" (meaning Master of Ceremonies). After leaving school, Campbell became interested in breakdancing and clubs. In 1983, he joined a breakdancing group and toured Europe with them, marking his early involvement in the performing arts before transitioning to music.

== Career ==
=== The first albums ===
In 1989 in Italy, Ice MC met singer and artist Roberto Zanetti (also as composer known as Savage and producer as Robyx). Their first single called "Easy", made in a hip house style, came out in 1989. It became successful all over Europe, reaching the top 5 in Italy and the top 3 in Germany. The two next singles, "Cinema" and "Scream", and the subsequent debut album, Cinema (released later in 1990), were also successful. In 1992 his second LP, My World, came out but failed to achieve the success of its predecessor.

=== The most successful hits ===
His third album, Ice'n'Green, was released in 1994 and featured Alexia on vocals. Three of his most successful songs, "Think about the Way", "It's a Rainy Day" and "Take Away the Colour", made the charts all over the world. For the third album Ice MC adopted an all new dreadlocks look and used Jamaican style rap, known as raggamuffin. The album was also released in the US, where the two biggest singles saw substantial club play and moderate dance music radio airplay. In 1995, Ice'n'Green – The Remix Album was released. This contained various remixes of previous hit singles.

=== Collaboration with Masterboy ===
In 1996, Ice MC decided to leave Zanetti and Alexia due to some disagreements. Shortly after that a new album, Dreadatour, (produced by Masterboy producer Enrico Zabler) was released. The hit from the album was "Give Me the Light", the second Single-Release from "Dreadatour" was "Music For Money" also produced by Enrico Zabler from Masterboy also the Album-Tracks "Never Stop Believing" and "It's Up To You". The Album "Dreadatour" itself was not a commercial success.

=== Since 2002 ===
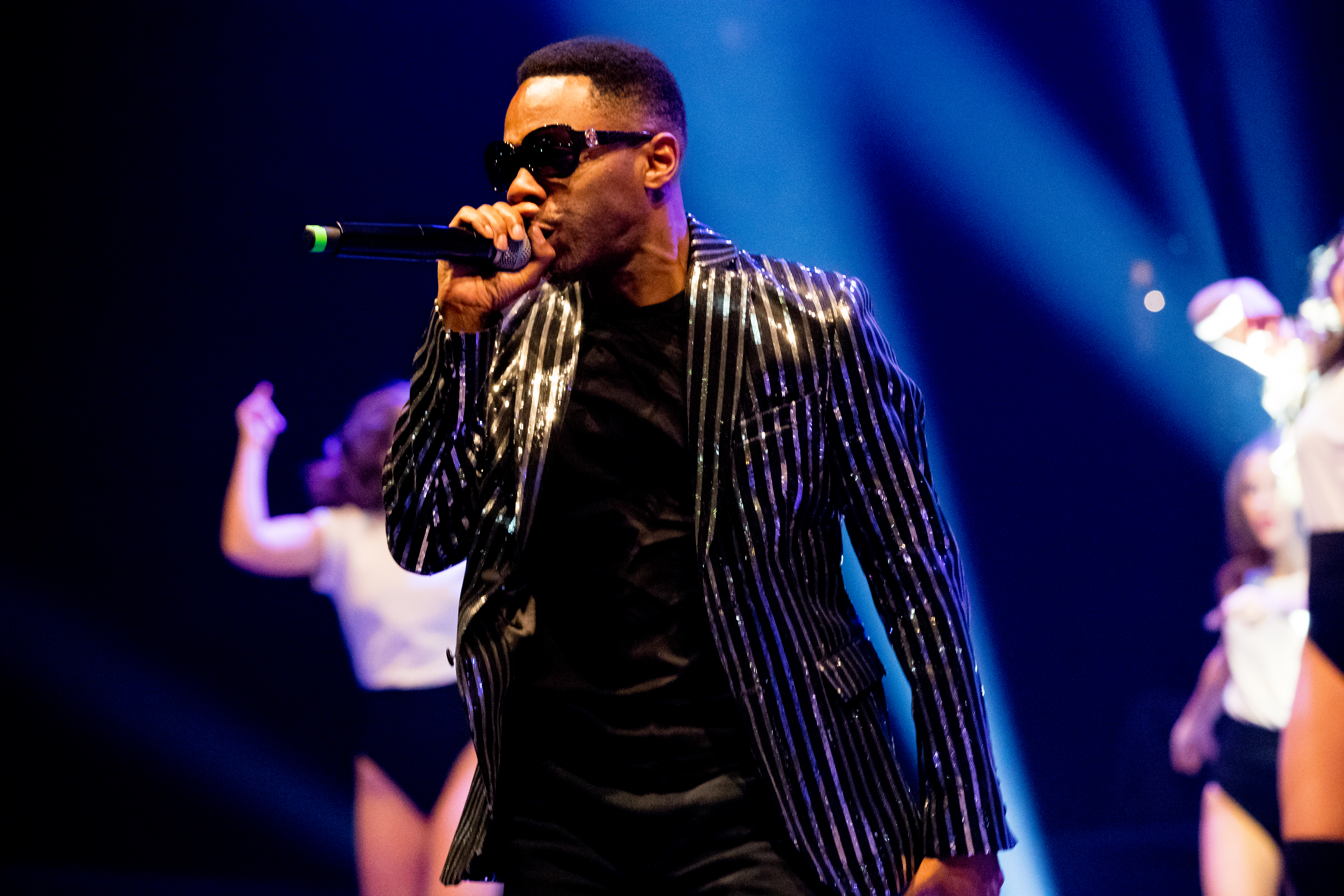
Ice MC performing in 2018

At the end of 2002, he decided to return to Italy and to contact Roberto Zanetti again. Together they started writing some new material and, at the beginning of 2004, they began recording a new album, Cold Skool.

In 2012 a new single "Out Tonight" featuring Giulia Gal was released and in 2013 the new remixes by Enfortro & Dirty Disciples were released.

In 2017, the single featuring Nico Heinz and Max Kuhn including an official video were released.

In February 2024, he was selected alongside DJ Jad, Wlady and Corona to compete in the final of Una voce per San Marino 2024, the Sammarinese national selection for the Eurovision Song Contest 2024.

== Discography ==
=== Studio albums ===
Title	Album details	Peak chart positions						Certifications
Title	Album details	AUT	FIN	FRA	GER	SWE	SWI	Certifications
Cinema	Release date: 19 March 1990; Label: Galaxis; Formats: CD	–	–	–	–	–	–	
My World	Release date: 24 November 1991; Label: Polydor; Formats: CD	–	–	–	–	–	–	
Ice'n'Green	Release date: 5 September 1994; Label: DWA (Dance World Attack); Formats: CD	34	4	5	41	31	31	SNEP: Gold
Dreadatour	Release date: 1996; Label: Club Zone, Polydor; Formats: CD	–	–	–	89	–	–	
Cold Skool	Release date: 19 April 2004; Label: DWA (Dance World Attack); Formats: CD	–	–	–	–	–	–	
"—" denotes releases that did not chart

=== Singles ===
Title	Year	Peak chart positions										Certifications	Album
Title	Year	ITA	AUT	BEL (FLA)	FIN	FRA	GER	NLD	SWE	SWI	UK	Certifications	Album
"Easy"	1989	–	7	–	–	17	3	–	–	4	–		Cinema
"Scream"	1990	–	–	–	–	–	14	–	–	–	–		Cinema
"Cinema"	1990	–	–	–	–	–	36	21	–	–	–		Cinema
"OK Corral!"	1990	–	–	43	–	–	–	–	–	–	–		Cinema
"People"	1991	–	–	–	–	–	–	–	–	–	–		My World
"Happy Weekend"	1991	–	–	–	–	–	–	–	–	–	–		My World
"Rainy Days"	1992	–	–	–	–	–	–	–	–	–	–		My World
"Take Away the Colour"	1993	19	11	15	–	31	–	–	18	–	–		Ice'n'Green
"Think About the Way"	1994	3	22	3	18	14	14	11	13	10	38		Ice'n'Green
"It's a Rainy Day"	1994	1	13	2	9	6	14	8	25	15	73	SNEP: Gold	Ice'n'Green
"Take Away the Colour ('95 Reconstruction)"	1995	–	–	–	16	31	–	25	–	–	–		Ice'n'Green – The Remix Album
"Give Me the Light"	1996	23	30	44	19	23	48	–	56	42	–		Dreadatour
"Music for Money"	1996	–	–	–	12	–	–	–	–	–	–		Dreadatour
"Let's Take It Easy"	1997	–	–	–	–	–	–	–	–	–	–		Dreadatour
"It's a Miracle"	2004	39	–	–	–	–	–	–	–	–	–		Cold Skool
"My World"	2004	–	–	–	–	–	–	–	–	–	–		Cold Skool
"Out Tonight"	2012	–	–	–	–	–	–	–	–	–	–		Non-album single
"—" denotes releases that did not chart

Other singles:

- 1997: "Bebop the Night" (original soundtrack "Wilde Zeiten")
- 1997: "Energy" (original soundtrack "Wilde Zeiten")
- 1998: "Busy Body" (unreleased single produced by Gary Jones, one of the co-producers of E-Rotic)
- 2013: "Out Tonight (Enfortro vs. Dirty Principle Edit)"
- 2017: "Do the Dip" (feat. Nico Heinz & Max Kuhn)
