= Cutting Crew =

English rock band

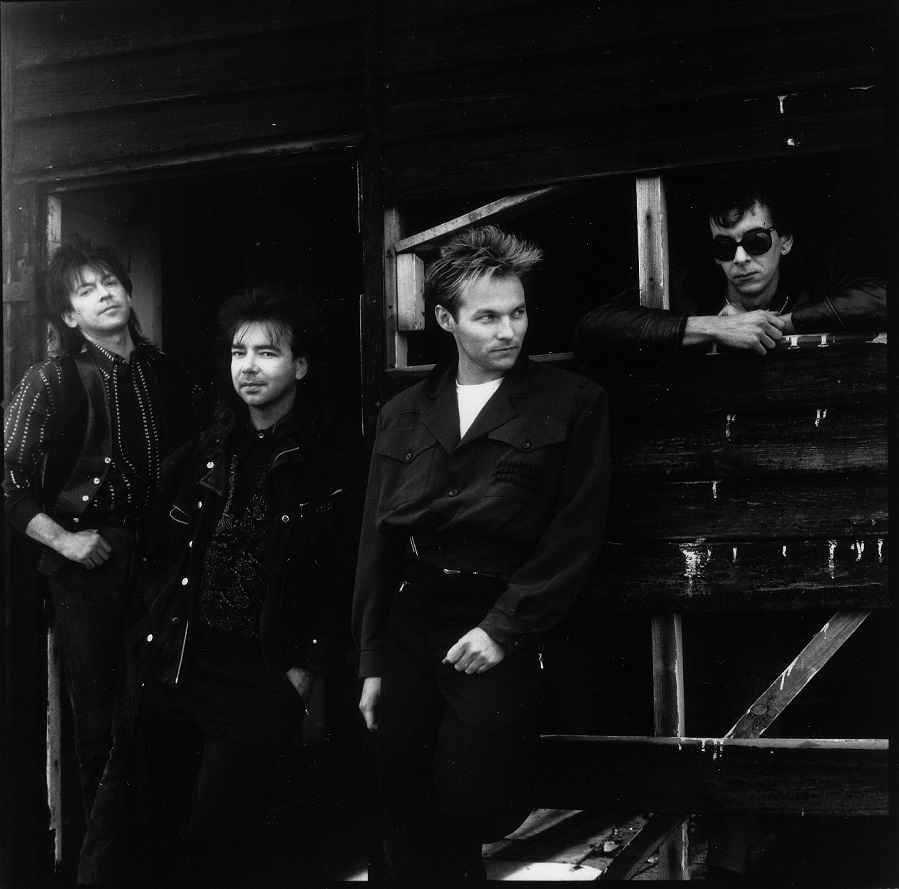
- Cutting Crew in 1989

Background information
- Origin: London, England
- Genres: Pop rock; new wave; alternative rock; synth-pop
- Years active: 1985–1993, 2005–present
- Labels: Virgin; EMI; Hypertension; Spectra; Cherry Red; In Like Flynn; August Day
- Members: Nick Van Eede; Tom Arnold; Gareth Moulton; Martyn Barker; Gary Barnacle; Jack Birchwood; Angela Brooks; Nik Carter; TJ Davis; Joolz Dunkley; Steven Fuller; Jono Harrison; Nick Kay; Mak Norman
- Past members: Martin "Frosty" Beedle; Colin Farley; Kevin MacMichael; Dominic Finley; Sam Flynn; Tony Moore
- Website: cuttingcrew.org

Cutting Crew are an English rock band formed in London in 1985 by lead vocalist Nick Van Eede and guitarist Kevin MacMichael. The group achieved international success with their 1986 debut single, "(I Just) Died in Your Arms", which reached No. 1 in the United States and charted highly worldwide. Their debut album, Broadcast (1986), produced several other singles, including "I've Been in Love Before", which also reached the U.S. Top 10, and earned them a Grammy nomination for Best New Artist in 1987. Despite line-up changes and a hiatus in the 1990s, Van Eede revived the band in the 2000s, releasing new material and touring under the Cutting Crew name. Known for their polished production and melodic rock sound, the band has maintained a dedicated following and continues to be recognised for their contributions to 1980s pop and rock music.

== History ==
=== 1985–1986: Formation ===
While still in his teens, Nick Van Eede (born Nicholas Eede) recorded a few UK solo singles in the late 1970s. Later, he was in the band the Drivers, which found success in Canada, particularly with their 1982 single "Tears on Your Anorak". While touring Canada, the Drivers had a support band called Fast Forward, whose line-up included guitarist Kevin MacMichael. Van Eede was so impressed with MacMichael's guitar playing that he asked him to form a new band with him. The Drivers broke up in 1984, but MacMichael continued to tour with Fast Forward. In 1985, MacMichael survived an accident when his tour bus drove off the side of a mountain, and he relocated to London, England to join forces with Van Eede. Initially, the two made demos before bassist Colin Farley and drummer Martin "Frosty" Beedle joined in 1986. They named the band "Cutting Crew" after a comment by Queen, who were once asked why they were not touring, and they replied, "We're a cutting crew", meaning they were only cutting records in the studio.

Having assembled the band, they invited representatives from various labels to a London recording studio to showcase the group, and they were later signed by Siren Records, which was part of Virgin Records. David Fuller was an unofficial photographer for the group and in 1985 accompanied them on tour with his second wife Sally.

=== 1986–1988: Broadcast and breakthrough ===
Their debut studio album, Broadcast, was released on Virgin Records in 1986. The song "(I Just) Died in Your Arms" was mixed in London at Utopia Studios by Tim Palmer. Although Virgin Records was already a major label in the UK, their debut song, "(I Just) Died in Your Arms", provided the first US hit for Virgin as a fully-fledged label. This song release quickly helped the band gain popularity. Virgin flew the band to New York City for initial recordings of the album, then to Australia to shoot music videos. The unknown band shot to No. 1 in the major US market, as well as smaller markets such as Canada and Norway, with their debut single. Their most popular single was a multiformat success in the US, where it also reached No. 4 on the Hot Mainstream Rock Tracks chart, No. 24 on the Hot Adult Contemporary Tracks chart and—in an extended remix version—No. 37 on the Hot Dance/Club Play chart. The song peaked at No. 4 in another major market, the UK Singles Chart, as well as becoming a hit in the smaller Switzerland and South Africa markets. It went to No. 2 in Sweden and Ireland, and No. 9 in Austria. Keyboardist Tony Moore joined in 1986 and was a touring member of the band through 1988.

The choice for a follow-up single in the UK had been "I've Been in Love Before", but that song spent only three weeks in the UK Top 40, peaking at No. 31. Their choice for follow-up single in the US was their third UK release, "One for the Mockingbird", but the song was a relative commercial disappointment on both sides of the Atlantic, just cracking the Top 40 of the Hot 100 at No. 38 and hitting No. 29 on the Mainstream Rock chart in the US, No. 47 in Canada and No. 52 in the UK Singles Chart.

The band took a chance on "I've Been in Love Before" again, this time with greater success. The song became Cutting Crew's second US Top 10 on the Hot 100, peaking at No. 9, and was their first major hit on the US Adult Contemporary chart, where it peaked at No. 2. This success prompted a UK re-release, and this time it spent five weeks in the UK Singles Chart Top 40, peaking at No. 24. The song failed to chart throughout most of Europe, but it peaked at No. 8 in Canada. Despite an unflattering review by Rolling Stone magazine, Cutting Crew received a Grammy nomination as the Best New Artist of 1987.

=== 1988–1990: The Scattering ===
Disputes with management led to a long recording hiatus, which stalled the band's career momentum. Cutting Crew's second studio album, The Scattering, was finally released in early 1989. Its lead single, "(Between a) Rock and a Hard Place" (CA 54, UK 66, U.S. 77), failed to reach the Top 40. Van Eede's vocal style, however, did score a sizeable US Adult Contemporary hit with "Everything but My Pride." That song peaked at No. 4 and stayed in the top 50 for 22 weeks. It climbed to No. 72 on the Canadian pop charts, though it failed to hit the US Hot 100. The prophetically named "The Last Thing" scaled the AC charts as high as No. 17 in early 1990 and went to No. 90 on the Canadian chart, and has been their final chart hit to date. Although a music video for the title track did air briefly in the UK and North America, The Scattering failed to chart.

=== 1991–1992: Compus Mentus ===
Recorded at The Mill Studios in Cookham, Berkshire on the Thames and produced by Chris Neil. Farley and Beedle left the group in 1991 with no replacement, leaving only Eede and MacMichael in the group. Eede sang and played keyboards and MacMichael played all guitars (lead and bass).

The album spawned one single, "If That's the Way You Want It." Neither the single nor the album itself charted. Within weeks of its release, Virgin Records was bought by EMI.

=== 1993–2005: Break-up and MacMichael's death ===
The band broke up in 1993; shortly after the release of their Compus Mentus studio album. After the break-up, MacMichael joined forces with Robert Plant of Led Zeppelin and played on his solo studio album Fate of Nations. On 31 December 2002, MacMichael died of lung cancer at the Queen Elizabeth II Health Sciences Centre in Halifax, Nova Scotia, at the age of 51.

=== 2005–2014: Reformation ===
In 2003, Van Eede formed the group Grinning Souls. This group independently released the studio album Capture in 2005. The following year, Van Eede took the decision to re-release the album under the title Grinning Souls, this time crediting the work to Cutting Crew. Grinning Souls (the band) became Cutting Crew for all subsequent live work: Van Eede is the only original Cutting Crew member in the group.

The new band toured in Jersey, Norway, the UK, Bulgaria, Hungary, Liechtenstein and Alabama with, amongst others, ABC, Berlin, Wang Chung, Supertramp, Level 42 and Tony Bennett. In 2008, Cutting Crew signed a US deal with label Spectra Records.

=== 2015–2019: Add to Favourites ===
In October 2015, Cutting Crew released their fifth studio album, Add to Favourites, through In Red Flynn label, via Cherry Red Records. It features "Till the Money Run$ Out", which was released as the first single on 4 September 2015. The band line-up included guitarists Gareth Moulton and Joolz Dunkley, bassist Nick Kay, keyboardist Jono Harrison, drummer Martyn Barker and the Blackjack Horns. The band embarked on a UK tour shortly after its release.

=== 2020–present: Ransomed Healed Restored Forgiven ===
At the end of 2018, Cutting Crew had announced, through their social networks, they had plans to release a new album featuring "new songs and new versions of CC classics." Although they did not have any new releases for 2019, a press release made by January of the following year announced the release for their second official worldwide compilation album titled Ransomed Healed Restored Forgiven, featuring nine songs from their past catalogue reworked as orchestral renditions, as well as other versions. Soon afterwards, the release date was announced on 27 March 2020 by Van Eede in a short video through the Cutting Crew official Facebook page. On the same day, they released the lead single for this project, an eight-track digital EP of their signature song "(I Just) Died in Your Arms", which also received a physical release, as well as a brand new video for the song uploaded on YouTube.

The album was released on 24 April 2020, through August Day label, on digital platforms such as Spotify and Apple Music. But due to logistics limitations during the COVID-19 pandemic, its physical release was delayed until 8 May 2020. Along with its other formats there is a limited box edition containing three different CDs, as well as the physical CD edition of the reworked (I Just) Died in Your Arms EP, and a postcard signed by Van Eede himself. To promote the album, Van Eede spoke to several media outlets, such as American Songwriter and Forbes. This greatest hits album has since spawned two more singles, the orchestral version of the Broadcast single "One for the Mockingbird", and the orchestral version of The Scattering single "Everything but My Pride".

On 5 August 2020, it was announced a vinyl limited edition, with only 300 copies pressed, would be available for purchase solely through DTC, making this the first vinyl edition of one of the band's releases since The Scattering. After Van Eede stated he had planned to do some concerts held in England in 2021 to support the album, the band announced on 7 September 2020 they would be the opening act for Go West's upcoming tour to happen in 2021, but, after the sanitary measures regarding COVID-19 pandemic still happening, the joint tour was postponed to the first half of the following year. Cutting Crew's setlist for this tour featured several cuts from Ransomed. After concluding touring the UK, Cutting Crew started their 35th Anniversary Tour in Germany.

== Members ==
Current members

- Nick Van Eede – lead vocals, rhythm guitar, keyboards (1985–1993, 2005–present)
- Tom Arnold – drums (2005–present)
- Gareth Moulton – lead guitar (2005–present)
- Martyn Barker – drums (2013–present)
- Gary Barnacle – saxophone (2013–present)
- Jack Birchwood – brass (2013–present)
- Angela Brooks – backing vocals (2013–present)
- Nik Carter – brass (2013–present)
- TJ Davis – backing vocals (2013–present)
- Joolz Dunkley – guitars, keyboards (2013–present)
- Steven Fuller – brass (2013–present)
- Jono Harrison – keyboards (2013–present)
- Nick Kay – bass (2013–present)
- Mak Norman – bass (2013–present)

Former members

- Martin "Frosty" Beedle – drums (1985–1993)
- Colin Farley – bass (1985–1993)
- Kevin MacMichael – lead guitar (1985–1993; died 2002)
- Tony Moore – keyboards (1986–1988)
- Dominic Finley – bass (2005–2008)
- Sam Flynn – keyboards (2005–2008)

== Discography ==
Cutting Crew discography
- Studio albums: 5
- Compilation albums: 7
- Singles: 13
- Video albums: 1

=== Albums ===
==== Studio albums ====
Title	Album details	Peak chart positions								Certifications
Title	Album details	UK	AUS	CAN	FIN	GER	NOR	SWE	US	Certifications
Broadcast	Released: November 1986; Label: Siren, Virgin; Formats: CD, LP, MC	41	77	11	7	49	3	30	16	BPI: Silver; IFPI FIN: Gold; MC: Gold; RIAA: Gold
The Scattering	Released: 16 May 1989; Label: Siren, Virgin; Formats: CD, LP, MC	—	—	—	—	—	—	—	150	
Compus Mentus	Released: 3 August 1992; Label: Siren, Virgin; Formats: CD, LP, MC	—	—	—	—	—	—	—	—	
Grinning Souls (Note: Originally released in 2005 as Capture under the name 'Grinning Souls'.)	Released: 6 March 2006; Label: Hypertension; Formats: CD	—	—	—	—	—	—	—	—	
Add to Favourites	Released: 2 October 2015; Label: In Like Flynn; Formats: CD, digital download	—	—	—	—	—	—	—	—	
"—" denotes releases that did not chart or were not released in that territory.

==== Compilation albums ====
Title	Album details
The Best of Cutting Crew	Released: 1993; Label: Virgin; Formats: CD, MC
Cutting Crew – Best of the 80's	Released: 2000; Label: Disky; Formats: CD
I'm on the Guest List	Released: 2017; Label: Self-released; Formats: CD
Icon	Released: 15 June 2018; Label: Universal Music Canada; Formats: CD
Ransomed Healed Restored Forgiven	Released: 24 April 2020; Label: August Day Recordings; Formats: CD, LP, digital download
Mixes / Extended / Live	Released: 22 April 2022; Label: Universal Music; Formats: digital download
All for You - The Virgin Years 1986-1992	Released: 9 February 2024; Label: Cherry Pop; Formats: CD Boxset

==== Video albums ====
Title	Album details
Live at Full House	Released: 1987; Label: M's Box; Formats: LaserDisc; Re-released on DVD in 2006

=== Extended plays ===
Title	Album details
(I Just) Died in Your Arms (Orchestral Version)	Released: 2020; Label: August Day Recordings; Formats: CD, digital download

=== Singles ===
Title	Year	Peak chart positions										Certifications	Album
Title	Year	UK	AUS	BEL (FL)	CAN	GER	IRE	NOR	US	US AC	US Main	Certifications	Album
"(I Just) Died in Your Arms"	1986	4	8	17	1	4	2	1	1	24	4	MC: Platinum; BPI: Platinum; BVMI: Gold; IFPI DAN: Gold; FIMI ITA: Gold; RMNZ: 2× Platinum	Broadcast
"I've Been in Love Before"	1986	24	—	—	8	44	25	—	9	2	50		Broadcast
"One for the Mockingbird"	1987	52	96	40	47	—	—	—	38	—	29		Broadcast
"Any Colour"	1987	83	—	—	—	—	—	—	—	—	—		Broadcast
"(Between a) Rock and a Hard Place"	1989	66	—	—	54	—	—	—	77	—	41		The Scattering
"The Scattering"	1989	96	—	—	—	—	—	—	—	—	—		The Scattering
"Everything but My Pride"	1989	—	—	—	72	—	—	—	—	4	—		The Scattering
"The Last Thing"	1990	—	—	—	90	—	—	—	—	17	—		The Scattering
"If That's the Way You Want It"	1992	92	—	—	—	—	—	—	—	—	—		Compus Mentus
"Hard on You"	2006	—	—	—	—	—	—	—	—	—	—		Grinning Souls
"Till the Money Run$ Out"	2015	—	—	—	—	—	—	—	—	—	—		Add to Favourites
"(I Just) Died in Your Arms" (Orchestral Version)	2020	—	—	—	—	—	—	—	—	—	—		Ransomed Healed Restored Forgiven
"Everything but My Pride" (Orchestral Version)	2021	—	—	—	—	—	—	—	—	—	—		Ransomed Healed Restored Forgiven
"—" denotes releases that did not chart or were not released in that territory.
