= Frosty Beedle =

British musician

Martin 'Frosty' Beedle
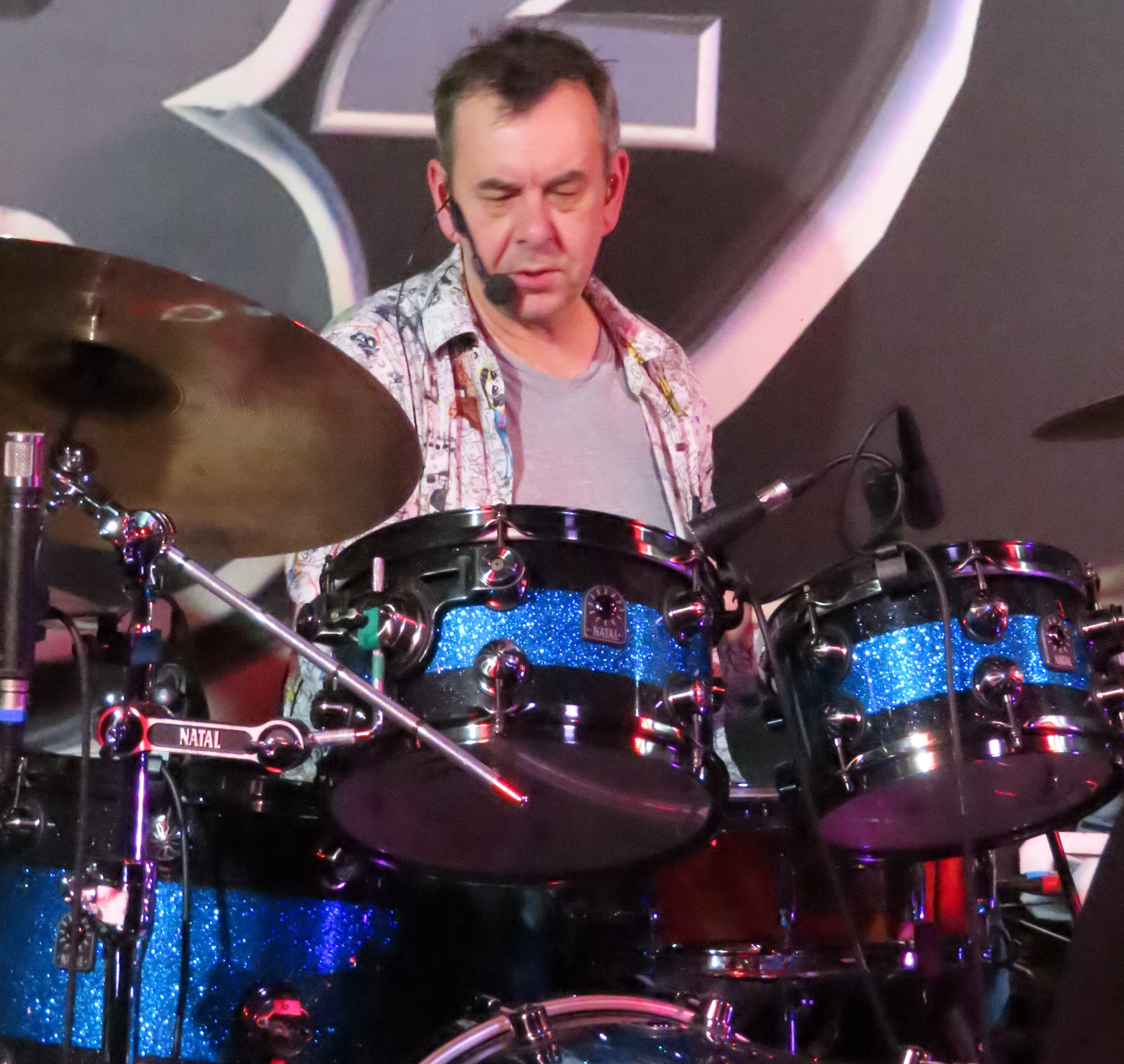
- Beedle performing with Lifesigns in 2020

Background information
- Born: Martin Philip Beedle; 18 September 1961 (age 64); North Ferriby, East Riding of Yorkshire, England
- Genres: Jazz, jazz fusion, funk, blues, R&B, rock, pop, orchestral
- Occupations: Musician, composer, producer
- Instruments: Drums, percussion, vocals
- Years active: 1970s – present
- Formerly of: Cutting Crew, Lifesigns

Martin "Frosty" Beedle (born 18 September 1961) is a British musician, producer and composer. He plays drums, percussion, programs keyboard parts and sings. He plays various styles of music covering many genres including jazz, jazz fusion, rock, pop, blues, R&B and Orchestral. He was the original drummer of Cutting Crew, remaining with them during their most successful period. He has also played in numerous West End musicals, and has been the principal drummer for Mamma Mia! since it opened in 1999.

He has played, recorded and toured with Boy George, Sinead O Connor, Midge Ure, Zucchero, Jason Donovan, Kiki Dee, Sarah Brightman, Jimmy Somerville, Gloria Gaynor, Clannad, Harold Melvin, Kim Wilde, ABC, and Steve Coogan to name a few and was an original member and co-producer of the progressive rock band Lifesigns. He has also been playing with friends in a group called The Two Pianos, a rock and roll band, for four years.

He has been and is touring worldwide with Queen Symphonic / the Queen Rock and Symphonic show which features international singers, a rock band and symphony orchestra. Their last tour before COVID-19 saw them playing in Japan with the Tokyo Philharmonic Orchestra at the beginning of 2020. Touring and west end shows being postponed he is currently working on his first solo album and has been collaborating with a number of musicians on individual projects and writing of music.

Variations of name: Beedle, Frosty Beadle, Frosty Beedle, Martin "Frostie" Beedle, Martin "Frosty" Beedle, Martin (Frosty) Beedle, Martin Beadle

== Biography (short) ==
Frosty was born into a musical family. His father loved big band music and his mother loved to sing. He had singing lessons from the age of six and started playing drums aged 9. He gained permission from the local authorities to play in pubs and clubs from the age of eleven and spent his youth playing semi professionally in anything from jazz trios to big bands.

He eventually turned professional aged seventeen joining the QE2 transatlantic liner and travelled the world completing three world cruises by the time he was twenty one. He moved to London in 1984. In 1985 he joined the pop group Cutting Crew. "(I Just) Died in Your Arms" was a top ten hit in many countries.

He left the band after six years in 1991 and went on to work with various acts, touring with some of them but also recording (singles/songs) with Sarah Brightman, Zucchero, Russell Watson and more.

At the same time he has been holding the drum chair in the Mamma Mia! show, the seventh longest running show in the London West End from year 2000.

== Discography (selection) ==
=== Studio albums ===
With Cutting Crew

- Broadcast (1986)
- The Scattering (1989)

With Zucchero Sugar Fornaciari

- Miserere (1992)

With Marie Claire D'Ulbado

- The Outside (of the Other Side)(1994)

With Russell Watson

- Reprise (2002)

With Never the Bride

- Never the Bride (1995)
- Vancouver 97 (2009)

With Sarah Brightman

- La Luna (2000)
- Harem (2003)

With Gregorian

- The Dark Side (2004)
- Chapter V (2004)

With Lifesigns

- Lifesigns (2013)
- Cardington (2017)

With The Boaters Project

- The Boaters Project (2016)

With Mari Wilson

- Mari Wilson – Pop Deluxe (2016)

=== Live Album/DVD ===
With Cutting Crew

- In Concert-405 (Live 1987)

With Lifesigns

- Under the Bridge – Live in London (DVD – 2015)

=== Singles ===
With Cutting Crew

- (I Just) Died in Your Arms (1986)
- I've Been in Love Before (1986)

With Boy George

- My Sweet Lord (1992)

== References (selection only) ==
INTERVIEW: Jacqui Hicks (New CD with Simon Carter, Phil Mulford and ‘Frosty’ Beedle – The Boaters Project) Retrieved 19 July 2020

The Voxtet and Band at Ronnie Scott's Retrieved 19 July 2020

Cutting Crew Official Video (I Just) Died In Your Arms

Cutting Crew Official Video The Scattering

Frosty Beedle on The Arts Show Interview with Michael Madden, 17 March 2020. Retrieved 19 July 2020.
