= Give Me the Light =

Single by Ice MC

from the album Dreadatour
- B-side: "Remix"
- Released: 1996
- Studio: Session Studios
- Genre: Eurodance
- Label: Club Zone
- Producer: Masterboy

Ice MC singles chronology
"It's a Rainy Day" (1994)	"Give Me the Light" (1996)	"Music for Money" (1996)

Music video
- "Give Me the Light" on YouTube

"Give Me the Light" is a song recorded by British, Italy-based Eurodance artist Ice MC, featuring vocals by Italian singer Valentina Ducros. Produced by German Eurodance project Masterboy, it was released in 1996, by Club Zone, as the first single from Ice MC's fourth album, Dreadatour (1996). The song was a moderate hit in Europe, entering the top 20 in Finland, and the top 30 in Austria, France and Italy. On the Eurochart Hot 100, "Give Me the Light" peaked at number 51 in July 1996. The accompanying music video was directed by Giacomo De Simone and filmed in Fosdinovo, Italy. Pan-European magazine Music & Media wrote in their review of the song, "With a crafty production and strong chorus, this US-born, Italy-residing artist once again proves that he is one of the prime exponents of the Euro-dance scene."

== Track listing ==
- 12" single, Italy
1. "Give Me the Light" (Cold as Ice Mix)
2. "Give Me the Light" (Club Mix)
- CD single, France
1. "Give Me the Light" (The Light) — 3:51
2. "Give Me the Light" (Club Mix) — 5:44
- CD maxi, Germany
1. "Give Me the Light" (Radio Edit) — 3:51
2. "Give Me the Light" (Air Cut) — 3:56
3. "Give Me the Light" (Tek Time Mix) — 5:44
4. "Give Me the Light" (Club Mix) — 5:23
5. "Give Me the Light" (Instrumental) — 4:19
- CD maxi (Remixes), Germany
1. "Give Me the Light" (Chico Y Chico 7" Latino Remix) — 3:41
2. "Give Me the Light" (Chico Y Chico Latino Club Remix) — 5:39
3. "Give Me the Light" (Brain Progressive Summer Mix) — 4:55
4. "Give Me the Light" (Unit Mix) — 4:30

== Charts ==
Chart (1996)	Peak position
Austria (Ö3 Austria Top 40)	30
Belgium (Ultratop 50 Flanders)	44
Europe (Eurochart Hot 100)	51
Finland (Suomen virallinen lista)	19
France (SNEP)	23
Germany (GfK)	48
Italy (Musica e dischi)	23
Sweden (Sverigetopplistan)	56
Switzerland (Schweizer Hitparade)	42
