= I've Been in Love Before =

Single by Cutting Crew

from the album Broadcast
- B-side: "Life in a Dangerous Time"
- Released: October 1986
- Length: 5:32
- Label: Virgin
- Songwriter: Nick Van Eede
- Producers: Steve Thompson; Michael Barbiero

Cutting Crew singles chronology
"(I Just) Died in Your Arms" (1986)	"I've Been in Love Before" (1986)	"One for the Mockingbird" (1987)

Official audio
- "I've Been in Love Before" on YouTube

"I've Been in Love Before" is a song by the English rock band Cutting Crew. Written by their lead vocalist Nick Van Eede, it was released as the second single from the band's debut studio album, Broadcast (1986). It reached No. 9 on the US Billboard Hot 100 the following year, making the song their second biggest hit in the United States.

== Chart history ==
=== Weekly charts ===
Chart (1986–1987)	Peak position
Canadian Singles Chart	8
German Singles Chart	44
Irish Singles Chart	25
UK singles chart	24
US Billboard Hot 100	9
US Billboard Hot Adult Contemporary	2
US Cash Box Top 100	11

=== Year-end charts ===
Chart (1987)	Rank
Canada	88
US Billboard Hot 100	97
US Adult Contemporary	44
