= Nick Van Eede =

English singer and producer (born 1958)

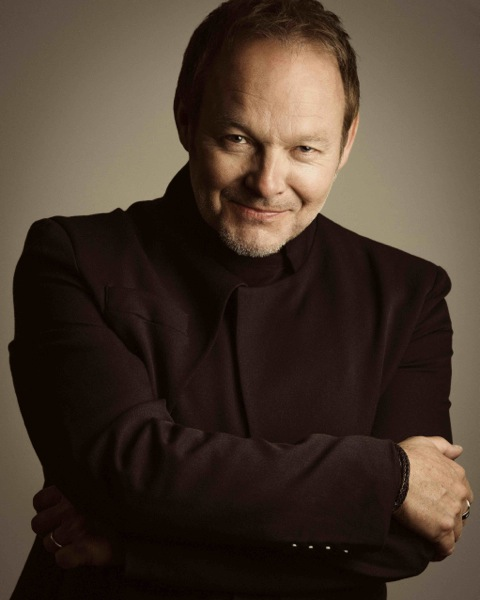
- Van Eede in 2014

Background information
- Born: Nicholas Eede; 14 June 1958 (age 68); Cuckfield, West Sussex, England
- Genre: Pop rock
- Occupations: Musician; songwriter; producer
- Instruments: Vocals; guitar; keyboards
- Years active: 1978–present
- Label: Barn
- Member of: Cutting Crew
- Formerly of: The Drivers
- Website: cuttingcrew.biz

Nick Van Eede (born Nicholas Eede; 14 June 1958) is an English musician. He is best known for singing and writing the 1986 No. 1 power ballad "(I Just) Died in Your Arms" for his band Cutting Crew, which saw international success including a top 10 placing on the UK singles chart.

== Career ==
=== 1978–1981 ===
While working as a hospital orderly in the late 1970s, Van Eede was discovered playing by ex-member of the Animals, Chas Chandler, who sent him on a tour of Poland aged 18 as support for Slade. His career continued with tours supporting headliners such as David Essex, Hot Chocolate and Alan Price.

During that time, Van Eede released five solo singles on Barn Records between 1978 and 1980, but none of them charted on the UK singles chart. The first three were "Rock 'n' Roll Fool" b/w "Ounce of Sense", "All or Nothing" b/w "Hold on to Your Heart" and "I Only Want to Be Number One" b/w "Dicing".

=== The Drivers (1981–1984) ===
Van Eede formed the Drivers with friends Mak Norman and Steve Boorer. In the early 1980s, they signed with a record label in Canada. They had a couple of hits there with "Tears on Your Anorak" and "Talk All Night", plus a studio album, Short Cuts. A music video for the track "Stolen Treasure" from the album received some airplay on MTV. They had a support band called Fast Forward, whose line up included guitarist Kevin MacMichael. Van Eede was so impressed with MacMichael's guitar playing that the former asked MacMichael to form a new band with him; however, MacMichael could not commit at that time. After a final single release with "Things", a Bobby Darin cover, the Drivers broke up in 1983.

=== Cutting Crew (1985–1992) ===
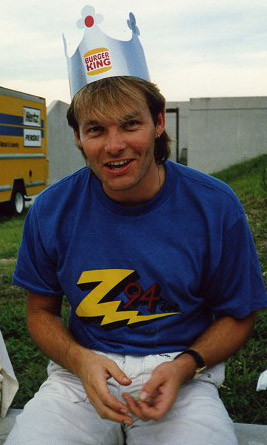
Van Eede in 1987

Whilst Kevin MacMichael was with Fast Forward, the band was involved in a car crash which left all of the members except MacMichael unable to continue touring. Ready to begin working with Van Eede, MacMichael moved from Toronto to London, where the two of them gave themselves one year to sign a recording contract. They recruited drummer Martin "Frosty" Beedle, previously a member of the cabaret band on the Queen Elizabeth 2 (QE2), and bassist Colin Farley, a session musician living in Spain. Van Eede came up with the band's name after reading an article in the British rock magazine Sounds, which described the band Queen as a "cutting crew", meaning a band that does not play concerts and instead stays in the studio recording new songs.

In 1985, Cutting Crew staged a showcase at a London recording studio for representatives from numerous record labels, and signed a recording contract with Siren Records, part of Virgin Records.

The first single to be released by the band was "(I Just) Died in Your Arms" b/w "For the Longest Time", released in the UK in August 1986. After an appearance on the BBC Television music chart television programme Top of the Pops, with the song being regularly played on the radio and its music video shown on TV, the single shot up to number 4 in the UK singles chart and in May 1987 was number 1 in America for two weeks (Virgin's first number one single in America). In total, the song went to No. 1 in nineteen countries.

The next single, "I've Been in Love Before" b/w "Life in a Dangerous Time" failed to break the UK in its first release in November 1986 but was quickly released again to reach No. 50 in the charts. Their debut studio album Broadcast was released shortly, which reached 41 on the UK Albums Chart.

=== Genesis audition (1996) ===
After Cutting Crew's demise, Van Eede went on to write and produce for other artists, including producing the original demo of Cher's hit "Believe". In 1996, he auditioned to be the new lead singer of Genesis following Phil Collins's departure, in a process where Kevin Gilbert, future Big Big Train vocalist David Longdon, former It Bites singer Francis Dunnery and former Stiltskin singer Ray Wilson were also seriously considered for the role; which ultimately went to Wilson.

=== 2000s ===
On the 2001 Marillion studio album Anoraknophobia, Van Eede is credited with co-writing the lyrics to the song "Map of the World" with Marillion frontman Steve Hogarth.

A new studio album originally titled Grinning Souls was released by Cutting Crew in 2005. Van Eede also appeared on the ITV show Hit Me Baby One More Time, on which he performed "(I Just) Died in Your Arms" and a cover version of Macy Gray's hit "I Try". He then embarked on tour with his new line-up: Gareth Moulton (guitar), Sam Flynn (keyboards), Dominic Finley (bass guitar) and Tom Arnold (drums). They toured the UK (which included the 'Here & Now 2008 Tour'), Germany, Trinidad and the United States.

=== Recent work ===
In 2015, a new studio album was released, Add to Favourites. Joining Van Eede on the album included guitarists Gareth Moulton and Joolz Dunkley, bassist Nick Kay, keyboardist Jono Harrison, drummer Martyn Baker and the Blackjack Horns. Throughout 2015–2017, the band toured South America, the US, Australasia and Europe.

In 2021, Van Eede received a BMI (Broadcast Music Inc) award for 6 million plays on US radio for "(I Just) Died in Your Arms".

=== Other projects ===
Since 2008, Van Eede has been a member of supergroup Mandoki Soulmates, formed by Hungarian musician Leslie Mándoki. Alongside Van Eede, the band's members in the group have included, amongst others: Randy Brecker, Bill Evans, John Helliwell, Chris Thompson, Bobby Kimball, Ian Anderson, Chaka Khan, Tony Carey and the late Jack Bruce and Greg Lake.

== Personal life ==
Nick Van Eede married Nikki McFarlane in June 1996. He has a daughter from a previous relationship.
