= Savage (musician) =

Italian musician and producer

Roberto Zanetti
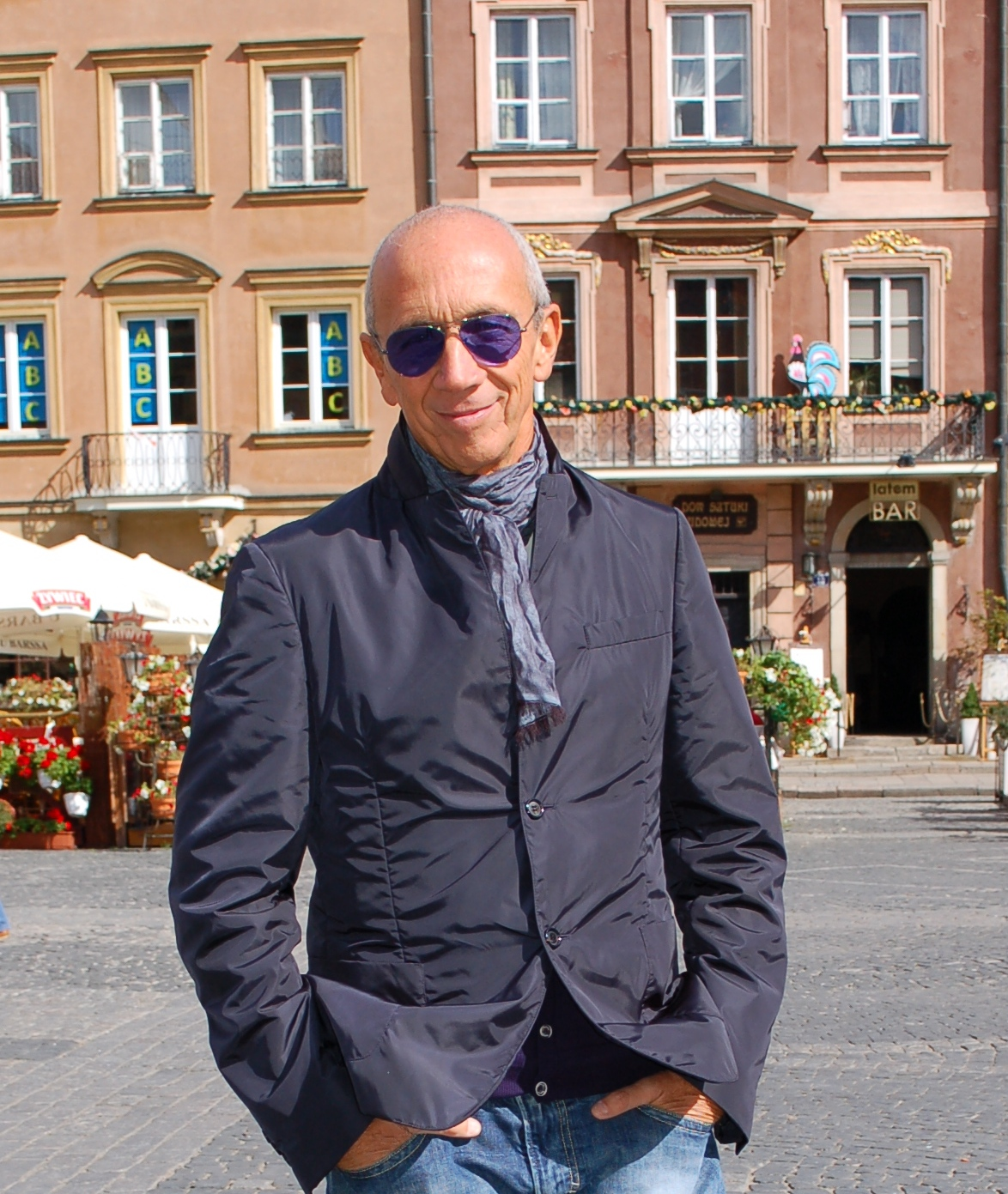

Background information
- Also known as: Savage, Robyx
- Born: 28 November 1956 (age 69); Massa, Tuscany, Italy
- Genres: Eurodance, Italo disco, electropop
- Occupations: Singer, record producer
- Years active: 1979–present
- Labels: Discomagic, DWA
- Website: savage-music.com

Roberto Zanetti (born 28 November 1956) is an Italian singer, music producer and businessman from Massa, Tuscany. As a singer, he is known under the stage name Savage and as a music producer he uses the alias Robyx.

== Career ==
At the age of fourteen, he began studying piano, quickly developing a passion for music that would shape his future career. During his high school years, he played in a band.

While in college, Zanetti's formed a band called Taxi, which included Zucchero Fornaciari on guitar. During this period, he started composing songs, initially in a melodic and commercial style before transitioning to a dance music style. In 1983, Taxi released their first single, "To Miami", which became a local hit in central Italy. This success was followed by another track, "Angelica", released under the pseudonym Joey Moon.

=== Breakthrough ===
In 1983, Zanetti collaborated with Giorgio Dolce to produce G.A.N.G.'s "Incantation", a cover of a Mike Oldfield song, which performed well in Italy. This marked the beginning of his partnership with Discomagic Records, a key distributor for his future work. Between October and November 1983, he produced several tracks, including "Buenas Noches" by Kamillo, "Starman" by Claudio Mingardi, "Magic Carillon" by Rose, and his breakthrough hit "Don't Cry Tonight" under the stage name Savage. This song marked his rise to prominence and led him to adopt the professional pseudonym Robyx, inspired by a cartoon character he created with a friend during school.

=== Savage ===
From 1984 to 1986, Zanetti focused on his Savage project, releasing the successful album Tonight and singles such as "Only You", "Celebrate", "Radio", "A Love Again", "Love Is Death", "Loosing You", and "Goodbye". During this time, he also produced "Live Is Life" by Stargo, a dance cover of Opus's hit, which topped the French charts and earned a gold record for 250,000 copies sold. As the lead singer of Savage, Zanetti began performing live shows and tours across Europe, gaining popularity in Eastern European countries like Poland and Russia.

=== Establishment of Robyx ===
In 1986, Zanetti founded his own recording studio, Casablanca Recordings, which also served as the headquarters for his production company, Robyx.

In 1989, he recorded "I Just Died in Your Arms" (a hi-NRG remake of the Cutting Crew song), as well as a greatest hits album. In 1994, he released another album, Strangelove, containing a number of remixes of his older songs and four mixes of the song "Strangelove" (by Depeche Mode). The last single which was released by Savage was "Don't You Want Me", which appeared on his own label, Dance World Attack Records (DWA) in 1994. This track does not appear on the Strangelove album.

As Robyx, he mainly worked as a songwriter and producer for other artists in the eurodance and euro house genres, working with Ice MC, Double You, Wilson Ferguson (Maurizio Felici - "I'm Singing Again", 1988), and Alexia.

At the beginning of 2019, Zanetti started recording Love and Rain, his first studio album following Tonight (1984). He worked with multiple European labels to release the album, including Polish MagicRecords and Russian RDS Records, as he was living in Poland at that time. The album was released at the beginning of 2020 and includes 14 new songs.

== Discography ==
=== Studio / remix / compilation albums ===
Title	Format	Year	Label
Tonight	LP	1984	Discomagic
Greatest Hits	LP	1989	Euroenergy
Don't Cry – Greatest Hits	LP	1994	DWA Records
Tonight (remastered)	LP	2010	DWA Records
Ten Years Ago (remastered)	LP	2010	DWA Records
Love and Rain	LP / CD	2020	MagicRecords
Before (1983–1986 Demo Collection)	CD	2020	MagicRecords
Love and Rain Remixes	CD	2020	Maschina Records
Maxisingles	LP	1987	Discomagic
Greatest Hits and More	CD	1990	Inter Sonus
More Greatest Hits & Remixes	CD	1992	Sonic Records
Strangelove	CD	1994	Sonic Records
The Original Maxi-Singles Collection	CD	2014	Pokorny Music Solutions
Greatest Hits & Remixes	CD	2016	ZYX Music
Italodisco – Maxisingles	CD	2020	MagicRecords
Eternity	CD	2026	Warner Music Italy

=== Singles ===
Title	Format	Year	Label
"Don't Cry Tonight"	12"	1983	Discomagic
"Only You"	12"	1984	Discomagic
"Radio" / "A Love Again"	12"	1984	Discomagic
"A Love Again" (Special Remix) / "Fugitive"	12"	1985	Discomagic
"Time"	12"	1985	Discomagic
"Celebrate"	12"	1986	Emergent
"Love Is Death"	12"	1986	Discomagic
"So Close"	12"	1988	Discomagic
"I'm Losing You" (Remix)	12"	1988	Discomagic
"I'm Losing You"	12"	1988	Discomagic
"I Just Died in Your Arms"	12"	1989	Euroenergy
"Goodbye"	12"	1989	Discomagic
"Don't Cry Tonight" ('89 Version)	12"	1989	Discomagic
"Don't Leave Me"	12"	1990	Euroenergy
"Something" / "Strangelove"	12"	1993	Dwa Records
"12" Remix Vol. 1"	12"	1994	Dwa Records
"Don't You Want Me"	12"	1994	Dwa Records
"12" Remix Vol. 2"	12"	1994	Dwa Records
"Twothousandnine"	12"	2009	Dwa Records
"I Love You" (12" vinyl maxi single)	12"	2020	Dwa Records
"Don't Cry Tonight"	7"	1983	Discomagic
"Radio" / "A Love Again"	7"	1984	Discomagic
"Only You"	7"	1984	Discomagic
"Time"	7"	1985	Discomagic
"Love Is Death"	7"	1986	Cgd
"Celebrate"	7"	1986	Ricordi
"I'm Loosing You"	7"	1988	Emi
"Don't You Want Me"	CD	1994	Dwa Records
"Dancing In The Dark"	Stream	2025	Warner Music Italy
"Eternity"	12"	2026	Warner Music Italy

== Films ==
- Italo Disco – Il suono scintillante degli Anni ’80 (2021)
