= Kevin MacMichael =

Canadian guitarist (1951–2002)

Kevin Macmichael
- Born: Kevin Scott Macmichael; 7 November 1951; Saint John, New Brunswick, Canada
- Origin: Dartmouth, Nova Scotia, Canada
- Died: 31 December 2002 (aged 51) Halifax, Nova Scotia, Canada
- Genre: Rock
- Occupations: Musician; songwriter
- Instrument: Guitar
- Years active: c. 1975–2002
- Formerly of: Cutting Crew

Kevin Scott Macmichael (7 November 1951 – 31 December 2002) was a Canadian guitarist, songwriter and record producer, best known for being a member of the 1980s UK-based pop-rock band, Cutting Crew, who had a number-one hit in 1986 with "(I Just) Died in Your Arms". Cutting Crew was nominated for a Grammy Award for Best New Artist in 1988.

== Early life ==
Macmichael was born in Saint John, New Brunswick and raised in Dartmouth, Nova Scotia.

== Career ==
=== Early years ===
Kevin got his first guitar in 1963, as did his friend Sandy Bryson. They were Beatles fans from the very beginning, learned to play many of their early songs, and went to see A Hard Day's Night in Halifax. Macmichael and Bryson started a band called The FourToGo in Dartmouth in 1964 with drummer Darrell Lysens and lead guitarist Al Arsenault, managed by Larry Manette. MacMichael then played with Bedford Row and Yellow Bus, later playing with the Nova Scotia band Chalice before joining the band Spice in 1978.

=== Cutting Crew ===
In the early 1980s, Macmichael was part of the Halifax band, Fast Forward, when he met Nick Van Eede, who was touring Canada as vocalist with the band The Drivers. Macmichael moved to London, England and began Cutting Crew along with Van Eede, bassist Colin Farley and drummer Martin "Frosty" Beedle in 1985.

=== Robert Plant ===
After Cutting Crew's run of success ended and Virgin Records let them go, he worked with Robert Plant playing guitar and composing songs for his 1993 album, Fate of Nations.

His interlude with Plant was short-lived; Macmichael recalled when he auditioned for Plant: "'Play me something', he said. He's about my age so the first things that came to mind were songs by Buffalo Springfield and Moby Grape. His jaw just dropped and he picked me up off the sofa and said: 'Never leave me'." The partnership lasted the single album and a world tour before Plant reunited with Jimmy Page, but the album's single "Calling to You", on which he played guitar, resulted in a Grammy nomination.

=== East Coast ===
After nine years in the United Kingdom, Macmichael returned to Nova Scotia where he collaborated with a number of Canadian East Coast musicians including Wayne Nicholson, Tribute, Chris Colepaugh & The Cosmic Crew, The Rankin Family and Sons of Maxwell.

== Death ==
Macmichael died of lung cancer at the Queen Elizabeth II Health Sciences Centre in Halifax, Nova Scotia on 31 December 2002. His surviving family members include his wife and two daughters, father, brother, and sister.
