= Deutschland sucht den Superstar season 10 =

Season of television series

Deutschland sucht den Superstar
- Season 10
- Judges: Dieter Bohlen; Bill Kaulitz; Tom Kaulitz; Mateo Jaschik; Andrea Berg (live show 7)
- Winner: Beatrice Egli
- Runner-up: Lisa Wohlgemuth

Release
- Original network: RTL
- Original release: 5 January – 11 May 2013

Season chronology
- ← Previous; Season 9 Next → Season 11

The tenth season of Deutschland sucht den Superstar was broadcast on German channel RTL from 5 January to 11 May 2013. The winner received a recording contract with Universal Music Group and €500,000. There were new features in season 10. Participants had to be between 16 and 30 years old and could audition in 30 cities in Germany, Austria and Switzerland. Bill and Tom Kaulitz from Tokio Hotel and Mateo from Culcha Candela became judges. Bruce Darnell and Natalie Horler both left after the completion of season 9. There was a trip to Curaçao during the recall. This is the first season in which three women reached the final four and the second season with a female final 2. After nine years, the show produced a female winner, since Elli Erl in season 2. Beatrice Egli won the show as the second female winner.

== Production ==
Production of season 10 started on 24 August 2012. There was a trip to Curaçao. Participants had to be between 16 and 30 years. They had the opportunity to stop by without an appointment to audition. RTL promised "many new features and a few surprises." Auditions were held in 30 cities in Germany, Austria and Switzerland. The 30 cities are Bern, Zürich, Freiburg, Friedrichshafen, Stuttgart, Mannheim, Saarbrücken, Munich, Vienna, Vösendorf, Salzburg, Regensburg, Erlangen, Freiberg, Hamburg, Hanover, Bremen, Bremerhaven, Fehmarn, Rostock, Cologne, Dortmund, Koblenz, Göttingen, Paderborn, Berlin, Frankfurt, Jena, Magdeburg and Mönchengladbach.

Bruce Darnell and Natalie Horler both left the show after season 9 and were replaced by Bill and Tom Kaulitz and Culcha Candela.

== The jury and host ==
Dieter Bohlen was born on 7 February 1954 in Oldenburg. He has been a judge on DSDS since season 1. He got his first job as a composer and producer in 1979. Bohlen is now considered the most successful German composer and producer. Bohlen and Thomas Anders, as members of Modern Talking, are the only German act with five songs in a row at number 1 on the German singles chart.

Bill Kaulitz was born on 1 September 1989 in Leipzig. He is a member of Tokio Hotel. Season 10 was his first season as a jury member.

Tom Kaulitz is a member of Tokio Hotel. Season 10 was his first season as a jury member.

Mateo of the band Culcha Candela is one of the new jury members for season 10.

== Auditions ==
Auditions were held in 30 cities in Germany, Austria and Switzerland. 32,078 people participated in the auditions, down from 35,401 participants the previous season.

== "Recall" ==
The jury chose 36 participants to go to Curaçao. The jury selected the 20 participants for the live shows. The jury selected eight participants who go directly to the "Mottoshows" (theme shows) and six participants were chosen by the viewers in the first liveshow.

== "Mottoshows" (theme shows) ==
=== Top 10 - "Mein Superstar" (My Pop Idol) ===
Original airdate: 16 March 2013

- Result for the ninth and tenth place

Constant	Percentage of calls
Lisa Wohlgemuth	27.6%
Simone Mangiapane	22.1%
Fairuz Fussi	18.5%
Björn Bussler	17.1%
Talina Domeyer	10.4%
Sarah Joelle Jahnel	4.3%

- Normal voting

Contestants	Song (Artist)	Percentage of calls
Susan Albers	All by Myself (Celine Dion)	14.19% (2/10)
Timo Tiggeler	Viva la Vida (Coldplay)	3.67% (9/10)
Beatrice Egli	Ich liebe das Leben (Vicky Leandros)	24.15% (1/10)
Maurice Glover	Whistle (Flo Rida)	4.62% (8/10)
Erwin Kintop	Next to You (Chris Brown feat. Justin Bieber)	6.50% (7/10)
Nora Ferjani	Back to Black (Amy Winehouse)	2.58% (10/10)
Ricardo Bielecki	Your Song (Elton John)	9.60% (5/10)
Tim David Weller	Here without You (3 Doors Down)	11.87% (4/10)
Lisa Wohlgemuth	I'm Like a Bird (Nelly Furtado)	13.37% (3/10)
Simone Mangiapane	End of the Road (Boyz II Men)	9.45% (6/10)

- Group Song: "What a Feeling"
- Jury Elimination Forecast: Nora Ferjani, Timo Tiggeler (B. Kaulitz), Timo Tiggeler, Erwin Kintop (T. Kaulitz), - (Bohlen, Mateo)
- Jury Favourite Performance: Susan Albers, Ricardo Bielecki (Bohlen) - (T. Kaulitz, Mateo, B. Kaulitz)
- Bottom 2: Maurice Glover, Nora Ferjani
- Eliminated: Nora Ferjani

=== Top 9 - "Liebe ist" (Love is) ===
Original airdate: 23 March 2013

Contestants	Song (Artist)	Percentage of calls
Maurice Glover	Love's Divine (Seal)	4.51% (9/9)
Lisa Wohlgemuth	Don't Know Why (Norah Jones)	15.26% (2/9)
Erwin Kintop	I Won't Let You Go (James Morrison)	8.25% (5/9)
Susan Albers	Open Arms (Mariah Carey)	11.04% (4/9)
Timo Tiggeler	Let Her Go (Passenger)	4.67% (8/9)
Simone Mangiapane	Se bastasse una canzone (Eros Ramazzotti)	7.44% (7/9)
Tim David Weller	When Susannah Cries (Espen Lind)	7.76% (6/9)
Beatrice Egli	Ich will immer wieder dieses Fieber spür'n (Helene Fischer)	26.43% (1/9)
Ricardo Bielecki	Impossible (James Arthur)	14.64% (3/9)

- Group Song: "Scream & Shout"
- Jury Elimination Forecast: Tim David Weller (Mateo & Tom), Maurice Glover (Bill), Timo Tiggeler (Mateo)
- Jury Favourite Performance:
- Bottom 3: Maurice Glover, Tim David Weller, Timo Tiggeler
- Eliminated: Maurice Glover

=== Top 8 - "Let's Party" ===
Original airdate: 30 March 2013

Contestants	Song (Artist)	Percentage of calls
Simone Mangiapane	You Can't Hurry Love (Phil Collins)	5.01% (7/8)
Tim David Weller	Balada (Gusttavo Lima)	7.64% (6/8)
Ricardo Bielecki	Don't You Worry Child (Swedish House Mafia feat. John Martin)	10.83% (4/8)
Beatrice Egli	Du hast mich tausend Mal belogen (Andrea Berg)	33.06% (1/8)
Timo Tiggeler	Viva Colonia (Höhner)	4.46% (8/8)
Lisa Wohlgemuth	I Follow Rivers (Lykke Li)	16.61% (2/8)
Erwin Kintop	DJ Got Us Fallin' in Love (Usher)	9.24% (5/8)
Susan Albers	She Wolf (Falling to Pieces) (David Guetta feat. Sia)	13.15% (3/8)

- Group Song: Medley: "Don't Stop the Party", "Feel This Moment"
- Jury Elimination Forecast: Timo Tiggeler or Erwin Kintop (Dieter)
- Jury Favourite Performance: Susan (Mateo); Beatrice, Ricardo, Simone (Tom); Beatrice, Simone, Ricardo (Bill); Beatrice, Lisa, Susan (Dieter)
- Bottom 4: Erwin Kintop, Simone Mangiapane, Timo Tiggeler, Lisa Wohlgemuth
- Eliminated: Timo Tiggeler

=== Top 7 - "Typisch Deutsch" (Typically German) ===
Original airdate: 6 April 2013

Contestants	Song (Artist)	Percentage of calls
Tim David Weller	Tage wie diese (Die Toten Hosen)	6.51% (6/7)
Ricardo Bielecki	Sie sieht mich nicht (Xavier Naidoo)	11.80% (4/7)
Beatrice Egli	Küss mich, halt mich, lieb mich (Ella Endlich)	29.67% (1/7)
Lisa Wohlgemuth	Elektrisches Gefühl (Juli)	14.90% (3/7)
Erwin Kintop	Engel (Ben)	19.64% (2/7)
Susan Albers	Männer (Herbert Grönemeyer)	11.72% (5/7)
Simone Mangiapane	Bilder von dir (Laith Al-Deen)	5.76% (7/7)

- Group Song: Medley: "Lila Wolken", "Ein Stern (...der deinen Namen trägt)"
- Jury Elimination Forecast: Simone Mangiapane (Dieter), Erwin Kintop (Bill, Tom & Mateo)
- Jury Favourite Performance:
- Bottom 2: Simone Mangiapane & Ricardo Bielecki
- Eliminated: Simone Mangiapane

=== Top 6 - "Solo & Duets" ===
Original airdate: 13 April 2013

Contestants	Song (Artist)	Percentage of calls
Susan Albers	All the Time (DJane HouseKat ft. Rameez)	
Tim David Weller	All the Time (DJane HouseKat ft. Rameez)	
Erwin Kintop	Stay (Rihanna)	
Lisa Wohlgemuth	Stay (Rihanna)	
Ricardo Bielecki	Nothing's Gonna Stop Us Now (Starship)	
Beatrice Egli	Nothing's Gonna Stop Us Now (Starship)	
Tim David Weller	Lasse redn (Die Ärzte)	6.94% (6/6)
Susan Albers	Respect (Aretha Franklin)	12.20% (4/6)
Erwin Kintop	Troublemaker (Olly Murs)	11.40% (5/6)
Lisa Wohlgemuth	Lights (Ellie Goulding)	12.69% (3/6)
Ricardo Bielecki	Und wenn ein Lied (Söhne Mannheims)	29.20% (1/6)
Beatrice Egli	Eine neue Liebe ist wie ein neues Leben (Jürgen Marcus)	27.57% (2/6)

- Group Song: None
- Jury Elimination Forecast: Tim David Weller
- Bottom 2: Susan Albers & Tim David Weller
- Eliminated: Tim David Weller

=== Top 5 - "German vs. English" ===
Original airdate: 20 April 2013

Contestants	Song (Artist)	Percentage of calls
Beatrice Egli	Du fängst mich auf und lässt mich fliegen (Helene Fischer)	36.89% (1/5)
Beatrice Egli	No No Never (Texas Lightning)	36.89% (1/5)
Ricardo Bielecki	Über sieben Brücken mußt du gehn (Peter Maffay)	17.95% (2/5)
Ricardo Bielecki	Mirrors (Justin Timberlake)	17.95% (2/5)
Lisa Wohlgemuth	Morgens immer müde (Laing)	14.59% (4/5)
Lisa Wohlgemuth	Just Like a Pill (Pink)	14.59% (4/5)
Erwin Kintop	Lieber Gott (Marlon & Freunde)	13.83% (5/5)
Erwin Kintop	Baby (Justin Bieber)	13.83% (5/5)
Susan Albers	Tausend Tränen tief (Blumfeld)	16.74% (3/5)
Susan Albers	My Heart Is Refusing Me (Loreen)	16.74% (3/5)

- Group Song: None
- Jury Elimination Forecast: Erwin Kintop & Susan Albers
- Bottom 2: Erwin Kintop & Lisa Wohlgemuth
- Eliminated: Erwin Kintop

=== Top 4 - "Candidates' Choice" ===
Original airdate: 27 April 2013

Contestants	Song (Artist)	Percentage of calls
Susan Albers	Raise Your Glass (Pink)	11.92% (4/4)
Susan Albers	Halo (Beyoncé Knowles)	11.92% (4/4)
Lisa Wohlgemuth	Baby When the Light (David Guetta feat. Cozi)	24.51% (3/4)
Lisa Wohlgemuth	Angel (Sarah McLachlan)	24.51% (3/4)
Beatrice Egli	Phänomen (Helene Fischer)	35.66% (1/4)
Beatrice Egli	Du kannst noch nicht mal richtig lügen (Andrea Berg)	35.66% (1/4)
Ricardo Bielecki	Shape of My Heart (Sting)	27.91% (2/4)
Ricardo Bielecki	Careless Whisper (George Michael)	27.91% (2/4)

- Group Song: "I Love It"
- Jury Elimination Forecast: Lisa Wohlgemuth
- Bottom 2: Lisa Wohlgemuth & Susan Albers
- Eliminated: Susan Albers

=== Top 3 - Semi-Final ===
Original airdate: 4 May 2013

Contestants	Song (Artist)	Percentage of calls
Ricardo Bielecki	Chasing the Sun (The Wanted)	22.85% (3/3)
Ricardo Bielecki	I Want to Know What Love Is (Mariah Carey)	22.85% (3/3)
Ricardo Bielecki	Stark (Ich + Ich)	22.85% (3/3)
Lisa Wohlgemuth	Heaven (Bryan Adams)	23.45% (2/3)
Lisa Wohlgemuth	Fallschirm (MIA.)	23.45% (2/3)
Lisa Wohlgemuth	Get Shaky (The Ian Carey Project)	23.45% (2/3)
Beatrice Egli	Die Hölle morgen früh (Helene Fischer)	53.70% (1/3)
Beatrice Egli	Ich lebe (Christina Stürmer)	53.70% (1/3)
Beatrice Egli	Die Gefühle haben Schweigepflicht (Andrea Berg)	53.70% (1/3)

- Group Song: None
- Jury Elimination Forecast: Lisa Wohlgemuth
- Bottom 2: Ricardo Bielecki & Lisa Wohlgemuth
- Eliminated: Ricardo Bielecki

=== Top 2 - Final ===
Original airdate: 11 May 2013

Contestants	Song (Artist)	Percentage of calls	Result
Lisa Wohlgemuth	Someone Like You (Adele)	29.75% (2/2)	Runner-up
Lisa Wohlgemuth	Elektrisches Gefühl (Juli)	29.75% (2/2)	Runner-up
Lisa Wohlgemuth	Heartbreaker	29.75% (2/2)	Runner-up
Beatrice Egli	Und morgen früh küss ich dich wach (Helene Fischer)	70.25% (1/2)	Winner
Beatrice Egli	Ich liebe das Leben (Vicky Leandros)	70.25% (1/2)	Winner
Beatrice Egli	Mein Herz	70.25% (1/2)	Winner

- Group Song: "What a Feeling" and "We Have a Dream"
- Jury Winner Forecast: Beatrice Egli
- Winner: Beatrice Egli
- Runner-up: Lisa Wohlgemuth

== Elimination chart ==
Legend
Female	Male	Top 14	Top 10	Winner

Safe	Most votes	Safe First	Safe Last	Eliminated

Stage:		Finals									
Week:		3/16		3/23	3/30	4/6	4/13	4/20	4/27	5/4	5/11
Place	Contestant	Result									
1	Beatrice Egli	—N/a	1st 24.15%	1st 26.43%	1st 33.06%	1st 29.67%	2nd 27.57%	1st 36.89%	1st 35.66%	1st 53.70%	Winner; 70.25%
2	Lisa Wohlgemuth	1st 27.6%	3rd 13.37%	2nd 15.26%	2nd 16.61%	3rd 14.90%	3rd 12.69%	4th 14.59%	3rd 24.51%	2nd 23.45%	Runner-Up; 29.75%
3	Ricardo Bielecki	—N/a	5th 9.60%	3rd 14.64%	4th 10.83%	4th 11.80%	1st 29.20%	2nd 17.95%	2nd 27.91%	3rd 22.85%	
4	Susan Albers	—N/a	2nd 14.19%	4th 11.04%	3rd 13.15%	5th 11.72%	4th 12.20%	3rd 16.74%	4th 11.92%		
5	Erwin Kintop	—N/a	7th 6.50%	5th 8.25%	5th 9.24%	2nd 19.64%	5th 11.40%	5th 13.83%			
6	Tim David Weller	—N/a	4th 11.87%	6th 7.76%	6th 7.64%	6th 6.51%	6th 6.94%				
7	Simone Mangiapane	2nd 22.1%	6th 9.45%	7th 7.44%	7th 5.01%	7th 5.76%					
8	Timo Tiggeler	—N/a	9th 3.67%	8th 4.67%	8th 4.46%						
9	Maurice Glover	—N/a	8th 4.62%	9th 4.51%							
10	Nora Ferjani	—N/a	10th 2.58%								
11-14	Fairuz Fussi	3rd 18.5%									
11-14	Björn Bussler	4th 17.1%									
11-14	Talina Domeyer	5th 10.4%									
11-14	Sarah Joelle Jahnel	6th 4.3%									

- On 16 March, the viewers chose the ninth and tenth candidate for the Top 10.

== Top 10 candidates ==
=== Beatrice Egli ===
Beatrice Egli was born on 21 June 1988 in Pfäffikon, Switzerland. Mostly a singer of Schlager songs, she became the second female winner of DSDS and the second winner from Switzerland after Luca Hänni the previous season. She received a recording contract from Universal Music Group and a total of €500,000.

Show (Original airdate)	Song (Artist)	Percentage of calls
Top 10 (16 March 2013)	"Ich liebe das Leben" (Vicky Leandros)	24.15% (1/10)
Top 9 (23 March 2013)	"Ich will immer wieder dieses Fieber spür'n" (Helene Fischer)	26.43% (1/9)
Top 8 (30 March 2013)	"Du hast mich tausend Mal belogen" (Andrea Berg)	33.06% (1/8)
Top 7 (6 April 2013)	"Küss mich, halt mich, lieb mich" (Elle Endlich)	29.67% (1/7)
Top 6 (13 April 2013)	"Eine neue Liebe ist wie ein neues Leben" (Jürgen Marcus)	27.57% (2/6)
Top 6 (13 April 2013)	"Nothing's Gonna Stop Us Now" (Starship) (duet with Ricardo Bielecki)	27.57% (2/6)
Top 5 (20 April 2013)	"Du fängst mich auf und lässt mich fliegen" (Helene Fischer)	36.89% (1/5)
Top 5 (20 April 2013)	"No No Never" (Texa's Lightning)	36.89% (1/5)
Top 4 (27 April 2013)	"Phänomen" (Helene Fischer)	35.66% (1/4)
Top 4 (27 April 2013)	"Du kannst noch nicht mal richtig lügen" (Andrea Berg)	35.66% (1/4)
Top 3 (4 May 2013)	"Die Hölle morgen Früh" (Helene Fischer)	53.70% (1/3)
Top 3 (4 May 2013)	"Ich Lebe" (Christina Stürmer)	53.70% (1/3)
Top 3 (4 May 2013)	"Die Gefühle haben Schweigepflicht " (Andrea Berg)	53.70% (1/3)
Top 2 (11 May 2013)	Und morgen früh küss ich dich wach (Helene Fischer)	70.25% (1/2)
Top 2 (11 May 2013)	Ich liebe das Leben (Vicky Leandros)	70.25% (1/2)
Top 2 (11 May 2013)	Mein Herz	70.25% (1/2)

=== Lisa Wohlgemuth ===
Lisa Wohlgemuth was born on 11 March 1992 in Annaberg-Buchholz. She was voted in the top 10 by the public as the first place. She reached the final with Beatrice. She was beaten by Egli and became the runner-up.

Show (Original airdate)	Song (Artist)	Percentage of calls
Top 10 (16 March 2013)	"I'm Like a Bird" (Nelly Furtado)	
Top 9 (23 March 2013)	"Don't Know Why" (Norah Jones)	
Top 8 (30 March 2013)	"I Follow Rivers" (Lykke Li)	
Top 7 (6 April 2013)	"Elektrisches Gefühl" (Juli)	
Top 6 (13 April 2013)	"Lights" (Ellie Goulding)	
Top 6 (13 April 2013)	"Stay" (Rihanna) (duet with Erwin Kintop)	
Top 5 (20 April 2013)	"Morgens immer Müde" (Laing)	
Top 5 (20 April 2013)	"Just Like a Pill" (Pink)	
Top 4 (27 April 2013)	"Angel" (Sarah McLachlan)	
Top 4 (27 April 2013)	"Baby When the Light" (David Guetta ft. Cozi)	
Top 3 (4 May 2013)	"Heaven" (Bryan Adams)	
Top 3 (4 May 2013)	"Fallschirm" (MIA.)	
Top 3 (4 May 2013)	"Get Shaky" (The Ian Carey Project)	
Top 2 (11 May 2013)	Someone Like You (Adele)	29.75% (2/2)
Top 2 (11 May 2013)	Elektrisches Gefühl (Juli)	29.75% (2/2)
Top 2 (11 May 2013)	Heartbreaker	29.75% (2/2)

=== Ricardo Bielecki ===
Ricardo Bielecki was born on 11 November 1992 in Bochum. He was the male favorite but he was unexpectedly eliminated in the semi-final, finishing in third place. He was the last male contestant.

Show (Original airdate)	Song (Artist)	Percentage of calls
Top 10 (16 March 2013)	"Your Song" (Elton John)	
Top 9 (23 March 2013)	"Impossible" (James Arthur)	
Top 8 (30 March 2013)	"Don't You Worry Child" (Swedish House Mafia feat. John Martin)	
Top 7 (6 April 2013)	"Sie sieht mich nicht" (Xavier Naidoo)	
Top 6 (13 April 2013)	"Und wenn ein Lied" (Söhne Mannheims)	
Top 6 (13 April 2013)	"Nothing's Gonna Stop Us Now" (Starship) (duet with Beatrice Egli)	
Top 5 (20 April 2013)	"Über sieben Brücken mußt du gehn" (Peter Maffay)	
Top 5 (20 April 2013)	"Mirrors" (Justin Timberlake)	
Top 4 (27 April 2013)	"Shape of My Heart" (Sting)	
Top 4 (27 April 2013)	"Careless Whisper" (George Michael)	
Top 3 (4 May 2013)	"Chasing the Sun" (The Wanted)	
Top 3 (4 May 2013)	"I Want to Know What Love Is" (Mariah Carey)	
Top 3 (4 May 2013)	"Stark" (Ich + Ich)	

=== Susan Albers ===
Susan Albers was born on 29 December 1983 in Rhede. She was stated as the best singer in the competition but sometime as too perfect. She was eliminated at 27 April and finished at the fourth place.

Show (Original airdate)	Song (Artist)	Percentage of calls
Top 10 (16 March 2013)	"All by Myself" (Celine Dion)	
Top 9 (23 March 2013)	"Open Arms" (Mariah Carey)	
Top 8 (30 March 2013)	"She Wolf (Falling to Pieces)" (David Guetta feat. Sia)	
Top 7 (6 April 2013)	"Männer" (Herbert Grönemeyer)	
Top 6 (13 April 2013)	"Respect" (Aretha Franklin)	
Top 6 (13 April 2013)	"All the Time" (DJane HouseKat ft. Rameez) (duet with Tim David Weller)	
Top 5 (20 April 2013)	"Tausend Tränen tief" (Blumfeld)	
Top 5 (20 April 2013)	"My Heart Is Refusing Me" (Loreen)	
Top 4 (27 April 2013)	"Raise Your Glass" (Pink)	
Top 4 (27 April 2013)	"Halo" (Beyoncé Knowles)	

=== Erwin Kintop ===
was born on 28 September 1995 in Rastatt. He was eliminated at 20 April and became the fifth place.

Show (Original airdate)	Song (Artist)	Percentage of calls
Top 10 (16 March 2013)	"Next to You" (Chris Brown feat. Justin Bieber)	
Top 9 (23 March 2013)	"I Won't Let You Go" (James Morrison)	
Top 8 (30 March 2013)	"DJ Got Us Fallin' in Love" (Usher)	
Top 7 (6 April 2013)	Engel (Ben)	
Top 6 (13 April 2013)	"Troublemaker" (Olly Murs)	
Top 6 (13 April 2013)	"Stay" (Rihanna) (duet with Lisa Wohlgemuth)	
Top 5 (20 April 2013)	Lieber Gott (Marlon & Freunde)	
Top 5 (20 April 2013)	Baby (Justin Bieber)	

=== Tim David Weller ===
Tim David Weller was born on 15 July 1992 in Dillenburg. He was eliminated at 13 April and finished as the sixth place.

Show (Original airdate)	Song (Artist)	Percentage of calls
Top 10 (16 March 2013)	"Here Without You" (3 Doors Down)	
Top 9 (23 March 2013)	"When Susannah Cries" (Espen Lind)	
Top 8 (30 March 2013)	"Balada" (Gusttavo Lima)	
Top 7 (6 April 2013)	"Tage wie diese" (Die Toten Hosen)	
Top 6 (13 April 2013)	"Lasse redn" (Die Ärzte)	
Top 6 (13 April 2013)	"All the Time" (DJane HouseKat ft. Rameez) (duet with Susan Albers)	

=== Simone Mangiapane ===
Simone Magiapane was born on 25 April 1985 in Rottenburg. He was voted in the top 10 by the public as the second place. He was eliminated on 6 April and finished at seventh place.

Show (Original airdate)	Song (Artist)	Percentage of calls
Top 10 (16 March 2013)	"End of the Road" (Boyz II Men)	
Top 9 (23 March 2013)	"Se bastasse una canzone" (Eros Ramazzotti)	
Top 8 (30 March 2013)	"You Can't Hurry Love" (Phil Collins)	
Top 7 (6 April 2013)	Bilder von dir (Laith Al-Deen)	

=== Timo Tiggeler ===
Timo Tiggler was born on 16 April 1992 in Nettetal. He became the eighth place on 30 March.

Show (Original airdate)	Song (Artist)	Percentage of calls
Top 10 (16 March 2013)	"Viva la Vida" (Coldplay)	
Top 9 (23 March 2013)	"Let Her Go" (Passenger)	
Top 8 (30 March 2013)	Viva Colonia (Höhner)	

=== Maurice Glover ===
Maurice Glover was born on 6 October 1986 in Frankenthal. He often was in dispute with Nora Ferjani. He was eliminated at 23 March and ended up as the ninth place.

Show (Original airdate)	Song (Artist)	Percentage of calls
Top 10 (16 March 2013)	"Whistle" (Flo Rida)	
Top 9 (23 March 2013)	"Love's Divine" (Seal)	

=== Nora Ferjani ===
Nora Ferjani was born on 2 June 1988 in Iserlohn. She was in dispute with Maurice Glover. She was eliminated in the first live show on 16 March and finished in tenth place.

Show (Original airdate)	Song (Artist)	Percentage of calls
Top 10 (16 March 2013)	"Back to Black" (Amy Winehouse)	

== Ratings ==
Episode	Date	Viewers		Market share		Source
Episode	Date	Total	14 to 49 years	Total	14 to 49 years	Source
Audition 1	5 January 2013	5.18 Mio.	3.21 Mio.	16.8%	27.0%	
Audition 2	9 January 2013	4.31 Mio.	2.81 Mio.	12.6%	21.9%	
Audition 3	12 January 2013	4.25 Mio.	2.60 Mio.	13.0%	22.8%	
Audition 4	16 January 2013	4.05 Mio.	2.43 Mio.	12.8%	20.3%	
Audition 5	19 January 2013	4.75 Mio.	2.87 Mio.	14.4%	23.8%	
Audition 6	23 January 2013	4.54 Mio.	2.49 Mio.	13.5%	21.7%	
Recall 1	26 January 2013	4.25 Mio.	2.80 Mio.	14.1%	22.6%	
Recall 2	30 January 2013	4.27 Mio.	2.51 Mio.	12.8%	20.5%	
Recall 3	2 February 2013	4.23 Mio.	2.61 Mio.	13.7%	22.7%	
Recall 4	9 February 2013	4.05 Mio.	2.49 Mio.	12.7%	22.1%	
Recall 5	16 February 2013	3.82 Mio.	2.36 Mio.	12.2%	20.1%	
Recall 6	23 February 2013	3.92 Mio.	2.34 Mio.	12.6%	19.8%	
Recall 7	2 March 2013	3.74 Mio.	2.33 Mio.	12.3%	21.0%	
Recall 8	9 March 2013	3.65 Mio.	2.16 Mio.	12.2%	18.8%	
Liveshow 1	16 March 2013	3.69 Mio.	2.26 Mio.	12.1%	20.3%	
Liveshow 2	23 March 2013	3.54 Mio.	2.10 Mio.	11.8%	18.5%	
Liveshow 3	31 March 2013	3.58 Mio.	1.94 Mio.	12.1%	17.8%	
Liveshow 4	6 April 2013	4.43 Mio.	2.58 Mio.	14.1%	22.6%	
Liveshow 5	13 April 2013	4.06 Mio.	2.50 Mio.	14.2%	22.9%	
Liveshow 6	20 April 2013	3.89 Mio.	2.16 Mio.	13.3%	20.2%	
Liveshow 7	27 April 2013	4.44 Mio.	2.30 Mio.	15.0%	21.2%	
Semifinal	4 May 2013	3.82 Mio.	2.02 Mio.	12.8%	20.0%	
Final	11 May 2013	4.63 Mio.	2.56 Mio.	16.3%	24.4%	

== Aftermath ==
The winner of the season, Beatrice Egli, received a recording contract with Universal Music Group and €500,000.
