= Online diary planner =

The early 1990s saw the advent of online diary planners, digital tools that help users keep track of upcoming meetings and events. Users may be executives, event managers, doctors, students, and others. Although the idea of keeping a record (or plan) of events is not new, digital planners allowed for those plans to be shared on the internet. The desire for effective online organizers and personal information managers (PIMS) has been growing. The web-based Filofax initially satisfied users' organizing needs, followed by ACT!, Time and Chaos, and Microsoft Outlook.

== Online calendars ==
Online calendars, a newer version of online diary planners, soon appeared. The main difference between online calendars and handheld computers and PIMS is that the older devices stored appointments and meeting schedules on a user's computer or handheld device; the newer calendars stored all information on the Internet. Online calendars were more accessible and less cumbersome; they could be accessed any time and anywhere with Internet access. Diarists turned to Outlook, which could be synchronized with Pocket PCs, in the first half of the first decade of the 21st century. The older versions required users to make regular backups or risk data loss.

=== First generation ===
Some of the first online calendars were generally unimpressive long-term, but they helped users add appointments straightaway. Users began to complain that they could view only one month's appointments on the calendar. Which means if they wanted to schedule a conference over one month away, they would be unable to do so because the application allowed viewing a calendar only 30 days at a time. Open calendars that intended users to connect with many people caused privacy problems. These online diary planners could not prevent double-booking. Most first-generation online calendars gave way to calendars created by giants of the information technology industry such as Microsoft and Yahoo! and their look and feel were criticized.

=== Microsoft Outlook and Yahoo! Calendar ===
Many users turned to Microsoft Outlook, but the problem of double-booking appointments and meetings continued. Yahoo! Calendar had been popular since the 1990s, with compatible software. However, the Yahoo! software had to be downloaded to an office PC if a user wanted to use it from their office; this was not always possible.

=== Google Calendar ===
Users can synchronize Google Calendar with Microsoft Outlook, using the conventional meeting-request procedure in other calendar systems. When accepted, the proposed date will show on the recipient's Google Calendar. A reminder of an event can be sent to the involved parties' Gmail account before the event begins.

Google Calendar sends meeting alerts as SMS messages to users' cell phones and smartphones via apps. Users can also download public holidays and important dates from the public calendar gallery. Google Calendar permits users to drag and drop events and happenings from one calendar (such as Microsoft Outlook) to another. Users must have an active Google account, however, and the double-booking problem continues.

== Other online planners and calendars ==
Other online calendars and diary planners are AirSet, Meeting Diary, and Mypunchbowl. AirSet is a multipurpose online planner that allows connection with colleagues, friends and family, and Mypunchbowl is a party and wedding planner. Meeting Diary is an online planner for meetings, conferences and events. Online planners exist for parties, families and friends, meetings, conferences and events, personal use, trips and special interests.

=== Parties ===
Mypunchbowl, Purpletrail, Bestpartyever, and Partypotato are also party planners. Mypunchbowl employs experts who advise users about party and wedding planning.

=== Families and friends ===
Cozi.com and AirSet are online diary planners for connecting with family members.

=== Meetings, conferences and events ===
Meeting Diary and MeetingWizard can be used to plan meetings, conferences and events. Meeting Diary has a large data-storage capacity and is a secure web-based application. Meeting Wizard, free of charge, allows the importation of emails and works across different time zones.

=== Personal planners ===
Diary.com, My Personal Diary, The Journal, and Remember the Milk are personal planners, and Diary.com is a private and a public platform.

=== Travel ===
Meet Me In, Triporama, Priceline.com, Tripit, Triphobo.com, Hilton e-Events, Groople, Trip Planner, Hotel Planner, TripHub, and GroupAbout help users plan trips and holidays. CarnivalConnections.com, InterContinental Hotels Group and Carlson Hotels Worldwide help travel groups with customized websites.

Triphobo.com, Groople, GroupAbout and most other online travel planners provide information on hotel bookings, sightseeing, leisure sports and activities, transportation and travel packages. Groople and GroupAbout travel groups can build their own websites to address each travel group's individual needs. Through these customized websites, travel groups can share travel tips. Groople and GroupAbout have liaisons with travel agencies and companies; Groople is affiliaterd with Kayak.com, Travelocity and SideStep, and GroupAbout is affiliated with Orbitz and SideStep.

Hotel Planner allows travelers to name the place to which they wish to travel and specify their other travel wishes. All such information is recorded on the site. Hotel Planner then asks hotels in that place for online quotes. If the travel group agrees on a price, Hotel Planner designs website for online booking.

On Priceline.com, groups of five to nine travelers can book accommodations by submitting quotes or agreeing to posted rates. Meet Me In allows up to four people to travel from two different places, get together at one place and receive a discounted travel package. Hilton Hotels' e-Events permits travel groups to see the prices of rooms, book rooms and conference halls, and construct a tailor-made site. TripHub is affiliated with Alaska Airlines and Orbitz. The site recommends travel companies and agencies which would meet travelers' needs.

Triporama allows tourists to interact with one another and discuss tour itineraries so members of a travel group can reach consensus when finalizing travel plans. It connects travelers to the web portals of travel companies such as Cruiseshipcenters international, which promote package tours. Trip Planner enables travelers to obtain an accurate travel plan, permitting users to specify their starting and ending points and tentative departure and arrival times. It is associated with the New York City Transit Authority.

Online travel planners have been developed by hoteliers and sightseeing agencies. Carnival Cruise Lines' CarnivalConnections.com was developed to help travel groups plan their tours. InterContinental Hotels Group and Carlson Hotels Worldwide also provide travel groups with tailor-made websites for booking and payment. Some feel that online booking is not always cost-effective; larger groups may get better discounts if they do not restrict themselves to the Internet, booking trips face-to-face or through a travel agency.

=== Special interests ===
Marco software is an online diary planner for wine enthusiasts, gardeners and photographers.
