= Riot on the Dancefloor =

Studio album by Groove Coverage
- Released: 13 March 2012
- Recorded: 2012
- Genre: Trance; house
- Label: Suprime Music; Sony Music Entertainment

Riot on the Dancefloor is the fourth album from German trance group Groove Coverage released in 2012. The album, their first in six years, had four singles: "Innocent", "Angeline", "Think About the Way", and the title track.

== Track listing ==
No.	Title	Length
1.	"Angeline (Radio Edit)"	3:30
2.	"Think About the Way (Single Edit)" (featuring Rameez)	3:13
3.	"Riot on the Dancefloor"	2:57
4.	"Dangerous"	3:21
5.	"Darkness"	3:02
6.	"Innocent (Radio Edit)"	3:48
7.	"Moonlight Shadow 2k12" (featuring P.S.Y.)	2:59
8.	"Shout"	3:05
9.	"The World is Mine"	3:08
10.	"I Want It"	3:00
11.	"All That Matters"	3:08
12.	"Think About The Way (DJane HouseKat Remix)" (Featuring Rameez)	4:00
13.	"Angeline (Cc.K Remix)"	5:00
14.	"Innocent (Club Mix)"	4:20
15.	"Think About The Way (Rob & Chris Remix)" (Featuring Rameez)	4:56
