= Glücksgefühle =

Studio album by Beatrice Egli
- Released: 17 May 2013
- Recorded: 2013
- Genre: Pop; Schlager
- Length: 40:16
- Label: Polydor; Island
- Producer: Dieter Bohlen

Beatrice Egli chronology
Feuer und Flamme (2011)	Glücksgefühle (2013)	Pure Lebensfreude (2013)

Glücksgefühle (transl. "Sense of Pleasure") is the fourth studio album by Swiss recording artist Beatrice Egli. It was released by Polydor and Island Records on 17 May 2013 in German-speaking Europe, following her win of the tenth season of Deutschland sucht den Superstar in 2013.

== Track listing ==
All tracks written by Oliver Lucas and Dieter Bohlen; and produced by Bohlen.

No.	Title	Length
1.	"Mein Herz"	3:18
2.	"Jetzt und hier für immer"	3:27
3.	"Verlieben, verloren, gelacht und geweint"	3:18
4.	"Ich geb Dir mein Ehrenwort"	3:20
5.	"Ist doch alles egal"	3:05
6.	"Ja, wenn Du denkst..."	4:03
7.	"Flieg nicht so nah ans Licht"	3:19
8.	"Unzertrennlich"	3:06
9.	"Das mit Dir"	3:20
10.	"Diese Nacht hat 1000 Stunden"	3:26
11.	"Zum Teufel mit Dir"	3:24
12.	"Tausend Mal"	3:10

== Charts ==
=== Weekly charts ===
Chart (2013)	Peak position
Austrian Albums (Ö3 Austria)	1
German Albums (Offizielle Top 100)	1
Swiss Albums (Schweizer Hitparade)	1

=== Year-end charts ===
Chart (2013)	Position
Austrian Albums (Ö3 Austria)	5
German Albums (Offizielle Top 100)	12
Swiss Albums (Schweizer Hitparade)	1

Chart (2014)	Position
Austrian Albums (Ö3 Austria)	65
Swiss Albums (Schweizer Hitparade)	88

== Certifications ==
Region	Certification	Certified units/sales
Germany (BVMI)	Gold	100,000^{^}
Switzerland (IFPI Switzerland)	Gold	10,000^{^}
^{^} Shipments figures based on certification alone.
