= Reblogging =

Mechanism in blogging

Reblogging (or, in Twitter parlance, retweeting) is the mechanism in blogging which allows users to repost the content of another user's post with an indication that the source of the post is another user.

It was first developed by Jonah Peretti at Eyebeam Art and Technology Center's R&D program under the project 'Reblog' (from where the term originates) as an open-source tool for individually-run blogs. Tumblr then built it into their social network for re-sharing posts within the network, and similar features ("Retweet" on Twitter, "Share" on Facebook) then followed.

For a number of microblogging and social networking services, reblogging has become a means of both social bookmarking and user commentary; unlike social news services like Digg, Slashdot, and Reddit, however, reblogging typically does not involve a centralized "front page" to which the highest-ranked post is appended.

Reblogging (and the increased attention paid to the indexing and encouragement of reblogging) has become a major feature of many social networking sites and content-hosting services, and it has also become a potent means of secondary content promotion and audience measurement whereby links to external content are syndicated across multiple profiles and the reposts are indexed as a measurement of currency and relevance.

== History and comparison ==
A historical precedent to reblogging is the viral nature of email, as "Internet petitions" and "chain emails" which encouraged email users to "resend" the email to at least a minimum number of contacts on one's contact list were highly popular (and highly controversial) in the 1980s and 1990s. With the rise of the World Wide Web, it was not uncommon for webmasters, including major news service websites, to encourage readers of a post to share a link to the post with others on one's contact list. Only in the mid-2000s was the "share via email" solicitation accompanied or replaced by branded "sharing" buttons from various social news or bookmarking services at the time, giving bloggers and news services a seemingly more accurate metric for readership and traffic than ever before; the issue of user moderation, however, gave bloggers and news services pause due to both real and alleged competition in moderation ranking of shared "front-page" posts. With the rise of micro-blogging in the latter 2000s, however, user moderation on front pages was de-emphasized as a feature in favor of "reblogs" on user profiles, which were usually taken by bloggers and news services as automatic endorsement of an original/linked post's currency, if not popular favor.

=== Reblog ===
Reblog was an open-source tool made at Eyebeam Art and Technology Center's R&D program, a team led by Jonah Peretti along with Michael Frumin, Michal Migurski, Alexander R. Galloway and Boris Anthony. "Reblog" was an open-source tool for individually-run blogs, with many early new media artists and bloggers using the tool to share content from one blog on another.

=== Tumblr ===
In 2007, Tumblr, a blogging service and network, launched. It is profile-driven and hierarchical in its facilitation of "reblogs". An original post by one Tumblr user is reblogged by another user by embedding a quote of the original post, link and publishing username in the repost, with the option of making a comment in reply to the previous post.

A feature of this method that distinguishes Tumblr from Twitter is that less emphasis is placed upon reblogging only the original post, resulting in often highly stacked semi-threaded conversations which are indexed and interpreted by the Tumblr server in the presented manner. While Twitter's character limit allows for little to no personal response, a Tumblr reblog allows for a significant amount of interpretations of the subject matter. As a result, posts to Tumblr are typically shown less as typical blog posts (as offered by most major blog providers) and more as a blend of both Internet forum and blog features. Another difference between the two platforms is that Tumblr reblogs are more often visual, while Twitter is more message-based.

=== X (formerly Twitter) ===
On Twitter, another micro-blogging service, the "retweet" phenomenon began in March 2007, whereby an informal protocol slowly developed among Twitter users. Initially called an "echo" the first instance was by Narendra Rocherolle. A month later the term "retweet" was first referenced. In this protocol, a post by User A which was considered notable by another Twitter user, User B, was copied by User B and reposted under User B's account and prefixed with "RT @username", with "RT" meaning "retweet". The @ sign had previously been developed as a means of replying to Twitter posts, while the hashtag protocol would later be developed by users within the same year to highlight important keywords which they wished to be indexed in a search engine.

In 2009, the "retweet" phenomenon would experience a major uptick in adoption by Twitter users in order to forward SMS posts by Iranian observers and participants in the events following the Iranian presidential election. In August 2009, Twitter officially began integrating the "retweet" mechanism by replacing the string "RT @username" with a retweet symbol emulating Tumblr's reblog symbol; in addition, retweet buttons were added to all Twitter posts (alongside "reply") and, by August 2010, an official "Tweet button" was developed and launched by Twitter for external websites, with Twitter-based application developer TweetMeme agreeing with Twitter to integrate the functionality of its own then-popular button into Twitter's official button. In April 2015, the "quote retweet" (also known as "Quote RTs" or "QRT") was introduced, with users able to retweet a post with their own commentary added above the original content. In August 2020, a "Quote Tweets" link was added under posts to allow users to see other users' quote retweets.

Tweetmeme, Topsy and a few other external third-party websites provide indexes of currently trending posts, hashtags, users and lists utilizing the retweet protocol. As such, Twitter is a powerful flowing social medium that disseminates instant news through an array of social media networks. The Twitter platform is a broadcasting service and a social network of open access of media through subscriptions by request or follow.

Following the acquisition of Twitter by Elon Musk in 2022 and its eventual rebrand of the platform to X in 2023, "retweet" was renamed to a straightforward "repost."

=== Facebook ===
Facebook, while not promoting itself as a social bookmarking, social news or micro-blogging service, eventually also began allowing users to share links to and comments on external webpages to their walls, and notably to re-share posts from other users' walls with a single click of an attached "Share" link, "reblog-style". In addition, buttons for publishers to automatically share their posts on Facebook and index the current number of user links to the linked post are available.

== Analysis ==
With the growing popularity of reblogging or re-syndication in the latter 2000s and early 2010s, a number of analyses have been offered on the functionality and value of the practice. Data scientists have shown that "retweeting cascades" play an important role in the spread of misinformation online. Chris Wetherell, creator of retweets for Twitter, described what he saw as negative consequences of retweets, stating, "We might have just handed a 4-year-old a loaded weapon". Andy Baio found that about two thirds of the Gamergate harassment campaign tweets during a 72-hour period that he studied were retweets. Jason Goldman from Twitter described quote retweets as the riskiest form of retweet, stating, "Quote retweet allows for the dunk. It's the dunk mechanism."

Linguists and philosophers, have studied the communicative value of retweets: if, as the popular motto goes, "a retweet is not an endorsement", what is the meaning of a retweet? The predominant view is that retweeting is like pointing at someone else's post (i.e. directing attention to it), or inviting one's audience to pay attention to it. RT is a popular acronym on social networking sites such as Facebook and Twitter, meaning 'Regards To' and 'Retweet' respectively.
