= Beatrice Egli discography =

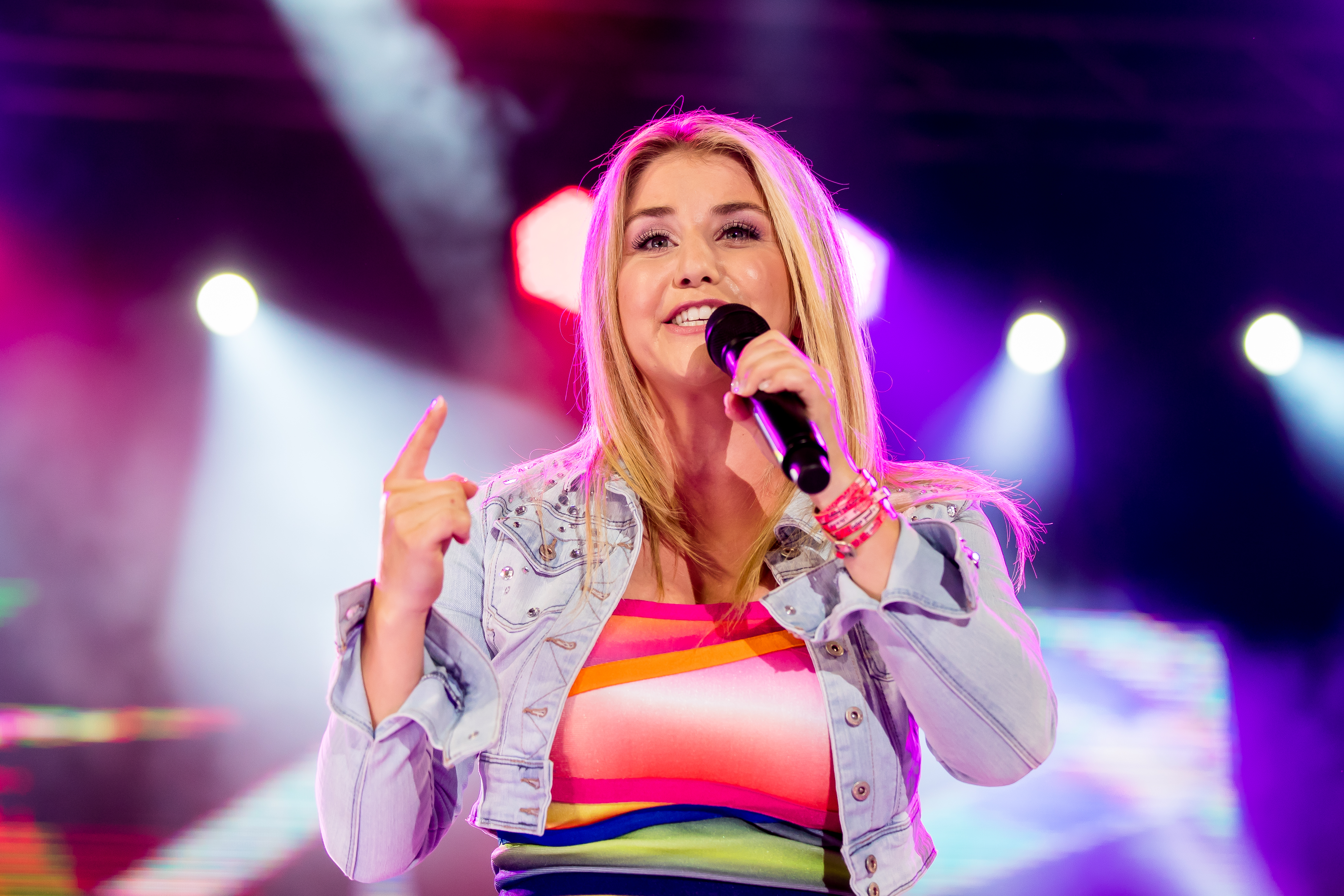
- Egli at the SWR4 in Speyer, 2016.
- Studio albums: 13
- Live albums: 1
- Singles: 16

== Albums ==
=== Studio albums ===
List of albums, with selected chart positions and certifications
Title	Album details	Peak chart positions			Certifications
Title	Album details	SWI	AUT	GER	Certifications
Sag mir wo wohnen die Engel (with Lys Assia)	Released: 12 October 2007; Label: Koch, Universal; Formats: CD, digital download	—	—	—	
Wenn der Himmel es so will	Released: 5 December 2008; Label: Solymar; Formats: CD, digital download	2	7	9	
Feuer und Flamme	Released: 9 September 2011; Label: Jabel, MCP; Formats: CD, digital download	12	9	43	AUT: Gold
Glücksgefühle	Released: 17 May 2013; Label: Polydor; Formats: CD, digital download	1	2	2	AUT: 2× Platinum; GER: 2× Platinum; SWI: Platinum
Pure Lebensfreude	Released: 22 November 2013; Label: Polydor; Formats: CD, digital download	1	5	7	AUT: Platinum; GER: Platinum; SWI: Platinum
Bis hierher und viel weiter	Released: 24 October 2014; Label: Polydor; Formats: CD, digital download	1	3	3	AUT: Platinum; GER: Platinum; SWI: Gold
Kick im Augenblick	Released: 8 April 2016; Label: Polydor; Formats: CD, digital download	3	2	3	AUT: Gold; GER: Gold
Wohlfühlgarantie	Released: 16 March 2018; Label: Polydor; Formats: CD, digital download	1	2	2	
Natürlich!	Released: 21 June 2019; Label: Polydor; Formats: CD, digital download	1	4	2	
Mini Schwiiz, mini Heimat	Released: 14 August 2020; Label: Polydor; Formats: CD, digital download	1	4	5	
Alles was du brauchst	Released: 27 August 2021; Label: Polydor; Formats: CD, digital download	1	2	1	
Balance	Released: 30 June 2023; Label: Ariola; Formats: CD, digital download	1	2	1	
Hör nie auf damit	Released: 3 October 2025; Label: Ariola; Formats: CD, digital download	2	4	4	

=== Compilation albums ===
List of albums, with selected chart positions and certifications
Title	Album details	Peak chart positions			Certifications
Title	Album details	SWI	AUT	GER	Certifications
Bunt – Best of	Released: 14 August 2020; Label: Polydor; Formats: CD, digital download	1	4	5	
Das Beste zum Jubiläum	Released: 28 July 2023; Label: Telamo; Formats: CD, digital download	—	—	29	

== Singles ==
=== As lead artist ===
Year	Single	Peak chart positions			Album
Year	Single	SWI	AUT	GER	Album
2007	"Sag mir wo wohnen die Engel"	—	—	—	Sag mir wo wohnen die Engel
2009	"Lippenstift"	—	—	—	Wenn der Himmel es so will
2013	"Mein Herz"	1	1	1	Glücksgefühle
2013	"Jetzt und hier für immer"	—	—	—	Glücksgefühle
2013	"Verrückt nach Dir"	53	55	48	Pure Lebensfreude
2014	"Irgendwann"	44	66	87	Pure Lebensfreude
2014	"Auf die Plätze, fertig, ins Glück"	61	65	75	Bis hierher und viel weiter
2015	"Wir leben laut"	—	—	—	Bis hierher und viel weiter
2015	"Ohne Worte"	—	—	—	Bis hierher und viel weiter
2016	"Kick im Augenblick"	—	—	—	Kick im Augenblick
2016	"Fliegen"	—	—	—	Kick im Augenblick
2016	"Wo sind all die Romeos"	—	—	—	Kick im Augenblick
2017	"Federleicht"	—	—	—	Kick im Augenblick
2017	"Herz an"	89	—	—	Wohlfühlgarantie
2018	"Mein Ein und Alles"	—	—	—	Wohlfühlgarantie
2018	"Verliebt, verlobt, verflixt nochmal"	—	—	—	Wohlfühlgarantie
