= Earth Moving =

1989 album by Mike Oldfield

Studio album by Mike Oldfield
- Released: 10 July 1989
- Recorded: 1988–1989
- Genres: Pop, rock
- Length: 40:50
- Label: Virgin
- Producers: Daniel Lazerus, Mike Oldfield

Mike Oldfield chronology
Islands (1987)	Earth Moving (1989)	Amarok (1990)

Singles from Earth Moving
- 1. "Earth Moving" Released: July 1989 (UK); 2. "Innocent" Released: July 1989 (EU); 3. "(One Glance Is) Holy" Released: October 1989 (EU)

Professional ratings
Review scores
Source	Rating
Allmusic	2/5 stars

Earth Moving is the twelfth studio album by English musician Mike Oldfield, released in 1989. Unlike Oldfield's albums released prior to Earth Moving, the album contains no instrumental tracks.

== Album analysis ==
Oldfield used several vocalists on the album, including his then girlfriend, Anita Hegerland. The album's music was performed mainly with synthesizers. It was the first time Oldfield recorded an album without an instrumental piece; each track being vocal-based pop and rock songs. Oldfield's only other album free of instrumentals is 2014's Man on the Rocks.

The final track, despite appearing to be a lengthier piece, consists of two short, apparently unconnected songs, combined into one track, with a noticeable pause in between. According to Oldfield, the album was made in full compliance with his recording company, Virgin Records, which demanded he create more commercially oriented material than his previous albums. After recording Earth Moving Oldfield wanted to move away from 'computerised music' and return to real musicians and instruments; this is evident in his next album, Amarok.

== Promotion ==
According to an interview Mike Oldfield and Anita Hegerland gave on the television programme Good Morning Britain, the song "Innocent" was inspired by their young daughter Greta, who appears in the song's music video. In the programme, Oldfield and Hegerland performed an acoustic version of the song, Hegerland singing and Oldfield playing the guitar.

"Earth Moving", "Innocent" and "(One Glance Is) Holy" were released as singles.

== Equipment ==
Earth Moving is the first album on which Oldfield used PRS guitars, having previously used Gibson guitars. Synthesizers on the album include a Fairlight Series III and various instruments made by Roland and Korg (including an M1). The album was recorded using an Atari 1040ST with C-Lab Notator software, a Harrison Series X console, a Studer A8800 tape deck with Dolby SR noise reduction, an Ampex Grand Master tape and ATC SCM200 monitors.

== Track listing ==
All tracks written by Mike Oldfield.

=== Side one ===
1. "Holy" – 4:37
2. "Hostage" – 4:09
3. "Far Country" – 4:25
4. "Innocent" – 3:30
5. "Runaway Son" – 4:05

=== Side two ===
1. "See the Light" – 3:59
2. "Earth Moving" – 4:03
3. "Blue Night" – 3:47
4. "Nothing But" / "Bridge to Paradise" – 8:40

== Personnel ==
- Mike Oldfield – guitars and keyboards
- Max Bacon – vocals ("Hostage", "Bridge to Paradise")
- Adrian Belew – vocals ("Holy"), left channel guitar solo ("Far Country")
- Nikki "B" Bentley – vocals ("Earth Moving")
- Anita Hegerland – vocals ("Innocent")
- Carol Kenyon – vocals ("Nothing But")
- Raphael Ravenscroft – saxophone
- Maggie Reilly – vocals ("Blue Night")
- Phil Spalding – bass guitar, backing vocals ("Bridge to Paradise", "See the Light", "Holy")
- Chris Thompson – vocals ("Runaway Son", "See the Light")
- Carl Wayne – backing vocals ("Earth Moving")
- Mark Williamson – vocals ("Far Country")

== Charts ==
=== Weekly charts ===
Chart (1989)	Peak position
Austrian Albums (Ö3 Austria)	21
Dutch Albums (Album Top 100)	55
German Albums (Offizielle Top 100)	1
Spanish Albums (PROMUSICAE)	21
Swedish Albums (Sverigetopplistan)	21
Swiss Albums (Schweizer Hitparade)	3
UK Albums (Official Charts)	30

=== Year-end charts ===
Chart (1989)	Position
German Albums (Offizielle Top 100)	33
Swiss Albums (Schweizer Hitparade)	22

== Certifications ==
Region	Certification	Certified units/sales
France (SNEP)	Gold	100,000^{*}
Germany (BVMI)	Gold	250,000^{^}
Spain (Promusicae)	Gold	50,000^{^}
Switzerland (IFPI Switzerland)	Gold	25,000^{^}
^{*} Sales figures based on certification alone.^{^} Shipments figures based on certification alone.
