= Innocent (Mike Oldfield song) =

1989 song by Mike Oldfield

Single by Mike Oldfield

from the album Earth Moving
- Released: July 1989 (EU); 2 October 1989 (UK)
- Recorded: 1988–1989
- Genre: Pop, rock
- Length: 5:35
- Label: Virgin
- Songwriter: Mike Oldfield
- Producers: Mike Oldfield; Daniel Lazerus

Mike Oldfield singles chronology
"Earth Moving" (1989)	"Innocent" (1989)	"(One Glance is) Holy" (1989)

"Innocent" is a single by British musician Mike Oldfield, released in 1989. It is from the album Earth Moving and features vocals from Anita Hegerland.

== Inspiration ==
According to an interview Mike Oldfield and Anita Hegerland gave in the TV-programme Good Morning Britain, the song was inspired by their young daughter Greta; who also appears in the music video. In the programme Oldfield and Hegerland gave an acoustic version of the song, Hegerland singing and Oldfield playing the guitar.

== Music videos ==
The music video features an Atari ST computer, a Korg M1 synthesiser and a Fender Stratocaster guitar and is available on the Elements – The Best of Mike Oldfield video. There is also a second part animated part live action video in existence.

== Track listing ==
1. "Innocent" (12" mix) – 5:35
2. "Innocent" – 3:25
3. "Earth Moving" (disco version) – 4:02

== Charts ==
=== Weekly charts ===
Chart (1989)	Peak position
Netherlands (Single Top 100)	45
West Germany (GfK)	8

=== Year-end charts ===
Chart (1989)	Position
West Germany (Official German Charts)	51

== Groove Coverage version ==
"Innocent"

Single by Groove Coverage

from the album Riot on the Dancefloor
- Released: 1 October 2010
- Recorded: 2010
- Genre: Dance
- Length: 2:57
- Label: Suprime Records, Sony Music Entertainment
- Songwriter: Mike Oldfield
- Producers: Axel Konrad, Ole Wierk, Verena Rehm

Groove Coverage singles chronology
"Because I Love You" (2007)	"Innocent" (2010)	"Angeline" (2011)

A version of the song was recorded and released as a single by German dance band Groove Coverage. The single was released digitally on 1 October 2010 in Germany as the lead single from their fourth studio album Riot on the Dancefloor. The song was written by Mike Oldfield and produced by Axel Konrad, Ole Wierk, Verena Rehm.

=== Music video ===
A music video to accompany the release of "Innocent" was first released onto YouTube on 20 September 2010 at a total length of three minutes and nine seconds.

=== Track listing ===
Digital download
No.	Title	Length
1.	"Innocent" (Radio Edit)	2:57
2.	"Innocent" (Bodybangers Remix Edit)	3:32
3.	"Innocent" (Club Mix Edit)	3:01
4.	"Innocent" (Original Extended Mix)	4:22
5.	"Innocent" (Bodybangers Remix)	5:32
6.	"Innocent" (CcK. Remix)	4:57
7.	"Innocent" (CcK Remix Edit)

=== Chart performance ===
Chart (2010)	Peak position
Austria (Ö3 Austria Top 40)	48
Germany (GfK)	38

=== Release history ===
Country	Date	Format	Label
Germany	1 October 2010	Digital download	Suprime Records, Sony Music Entertainment

== Other recorded versions ==
- In 2010 Jason Donovan recorded a version of "Innocent" for his 1980s covers album Soundtrack of the 80s.
