= Angeline (Groove Coverage song) =

Single by Groove Coverage

from the album Riot on the Dancefloor
- Released: April 29, 2011
- Recorded: 2010
- Genre: Dance
- Length: 3:30
- Label: Suprime Records; Sony Music Entertainment
- Songwriters: Axel Konrad; Ole Wierk; Uwe Busse; David Sobol; Karlheinz Rupprich
- Producers: Axel Konrad; Ole Wierk; Verena Rehm

Groove Coverage singles chronology
"Innocent" (2010)	"Angeline" (2011)	"Think About the Way" (2012)

"Angeline" is a single by German dance band Groove Coverage. The single was released digitally on April 29, 2011, in Germany as the second single from their fourth studio album Riot on the Dancefloor. The song was written by Axel Konrad, Ole Wierk, Uwe Busse, David Sobol and Karlheinz Rupprich and originally released as "Lotusblume" by the former German Schlager group Die Flippers in the year 1989.

== Music video ==
A music video to accompany the release of "Angeline" was first released onto YouTube on 21 April 2011 at a total length of three minutes and twenty-eight seconds.

== Track listing ==
Digital download
No.	Title	Length
1.	"Angeline" (Radio Edit)	3:30
2.	"Angeline" (Club Mix)	5:04
3.	"Angeline" (Dirty Bits Remix)	5:00
4.	"Angeline" (Bodybangers Remix)	6:05
5.	"Angeline" (Extended Version)	4:45
6.	"Angeline" (Dirty Bits Remix Edit)	3:55

== Chart performance ==
Chart (2011)	Peak position
Austria (Ö3 Austria Top 40)	26
Germany (Media Control AG)	22

== Release history ==
Country	Date	Format	Label
Germany	April 29, 2011	Digital download	Suprime Records, Sony Music Entertainment
