= Beatrice Egli =

Swiss singer (born 1988)

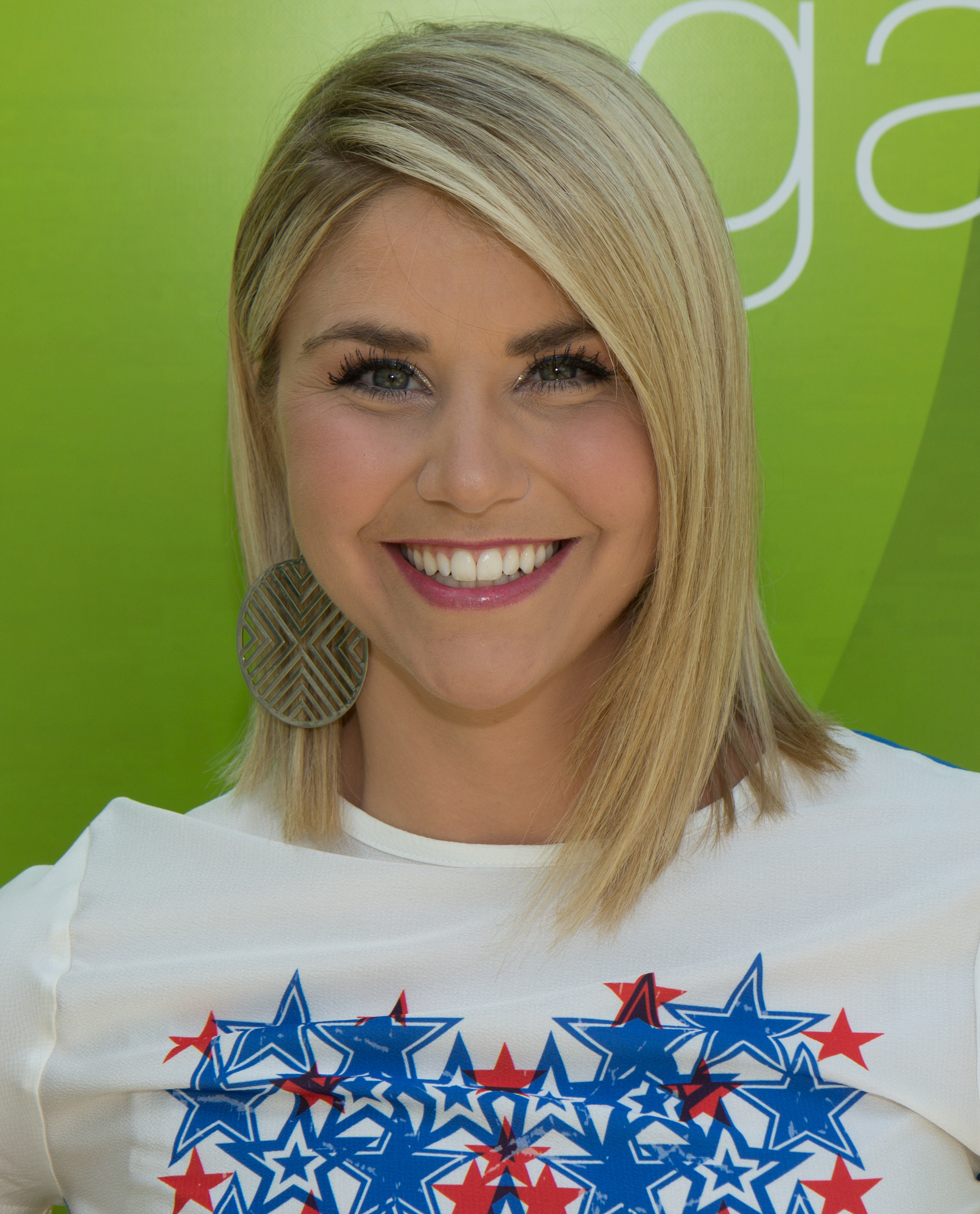
- Egli in 2018

Background information
- Born: Beatrice Margerite Egli; 21 June 1988 (age 37); Lachen, Switzerland
- Genres: Pop; Schlager; Europop
- Occupation: Musician
- Instrument: Vocals
- Years active: 2007-present

Beatrice Margerite Egli (German pronunciation: [ˈbeː.aˌtʁɪs maʁɡeˈʁiːtə ˈeːɡli]; born 21 June 1988) is a Swiss singer, television broadcast presenter and moderator. A pop and Schlager singer, Egli became famous after winning the 10th season of the German music competition Deutschland sucht den Superstar, broadcast by RTL. Egli became the second contestant from Switzerland to win the title after Luca Hänni won in the previous season of the series. She has sold over 2,000,000 records in Germany, Switzerland, and Austria.

She has hosted a show called Die Beatrice Egli Show since 2022.

== Early life ==
Egli was born in 1988 in Lachen, in the canton of Schwyz. She comes from an Austrian-Swiss family of butchers and has been singing since the age of nine.

At 14, she began taking singing lessons and singing at folk festivals. She trained as a hairdresser and worked in this profession for a year. She lived with her two older brothers and her younger brother in her parents' house in Pfäffikon, also in the canton of Schwyz until she was 28. In 2016, she moved into her own apartment nearby.

== Early career ==
In 2007, Egli joined up with Lys Assia, an established artist, and together they released the album "Sag mir wo wohnen die Engel" (Tell Me Where Do The Angels Live), with the title-track from the album becoming an official single. In April 2007, she took part in the Grand Prix der Volksmusik (a folk music competition) reaching final 16 in August 2007 and finishing 12th. In 2009, she performed at Musikantenstadl, a live television entertainment program broadcast throughout Austria, Germany, and Switzerland and featuring popular folk and Schlager music, with the song "Lippenstift" (Lipstick). She eventually trained as a hairdresser for a brief time, and in 2011, entered the acting-school Schule für Schauspiel Hamburg before applying to Deutschland sucht den Superstar in 2013, which she won.

== Participation in Deutschland sucht den Superstar ==
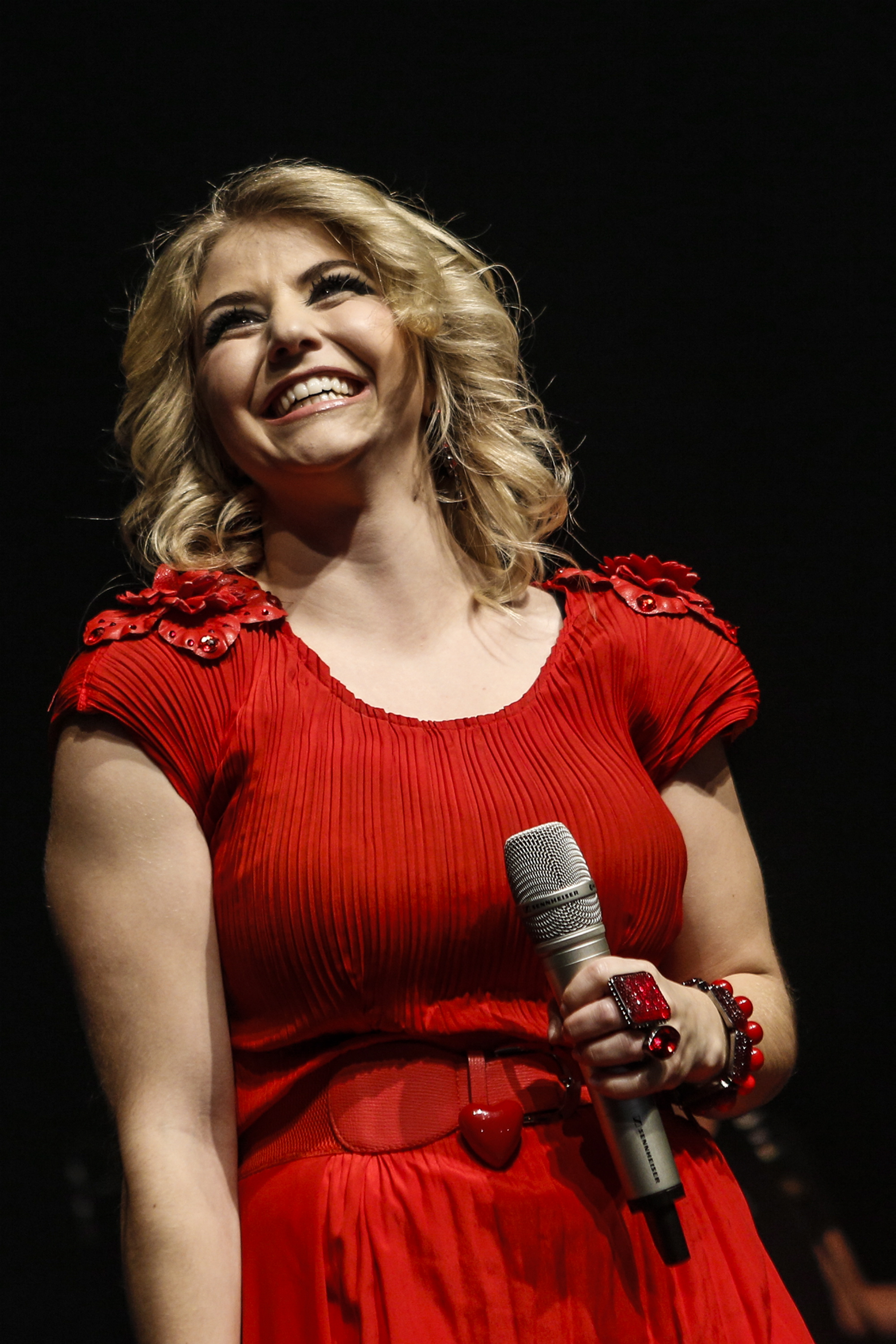
Egli performing in 2013.

In May 2013, Egli won the finale of the tenth season of Deutschland sucht den Superstar with 70.25 percent of the viewer votes. With one exception, she received the most viewer calls in all the theme shows. She received €500,000 and a recording contract with Universal Music Group. Her first single after participating in DSDS was "Mein Herz" (My Heart), which was written and produced by Dieter Bohlen, a former member of German pop duo Modern Talking and a judge on the show. The song debuted at number one in the official German, Austrian, and Swiss singles charts in its first week of sales.

Show (Original Airdate)	Song (Artist)	Percentage of calls
Top 10 (16 March 2013)	"Ich liebe das Leben" (Vicky Leandros)	24.15% (1/10)
Top 9 (23 March 2013)	"Ich will immer wieder dieses Fieber spür'n" (Helene Fischer)	26.43% (1/9)
Top 8 (30 March 2013)	"Du hast mich tausend Mal belogen" (Andrea Berg)	33.06% (1/8)
Top 7 (6 April 2013)	"Küss mich, halt mich, lieb mich" (Ella Endlich)	29.67% (1/7)
Top 6 (13 April 2013)	"Eine neue Liebe ist wie ein neues Leben" (Jürgen Marcus)	29.20% (1/6)
Top 6 (13 April 2013)	"Nothing's Gonna Stop Us Now" (Starship) (duet with Ricardo Bielecki)	29.20% (1/6)
Top 5 (20 April 2013)	"Du fängst mich auf und lässt mich fliegen" (Helene Fischer)	36.89% (1/5)
Top 5 (20 April 2013)	"No No Never" (Texas Lightning)	36.89% (1/5)
Top 4 (27 April 2013)	"Phänomen" (Helene Fischer)	35.66% (1/4)
Top 4 (27 April 2013)	"Du kannst noch nicht mal richtig lügen" (Andrea Berg)	35.66% (1/4)
Top 3 (4 May 2013)	"Die Hölle morgen früh" (Helene Fischer)	53.70% (1/3)
Top 3 (4 May 2013)	"Ich lebe" (Christina Stürmer)	53.70% (1/3)
Top 3 (4 May 2013)	"Die Gefühle haben Schweigepflicht" (Andrea Berg)	53.70% (1/3)
Top 2 (11 May 2013)	Und morgen früh küss ich dich wach (Helene Fischer)	70.25% (1/2)
Top 2 (11 May 2013)	Ich liebe das Leben (Vicky Leandros)	70.25% (1/2)
Top 2 (11 May 2013)	Mein Herz	70.25% (1/2)

== After her victory at the DSDS ==
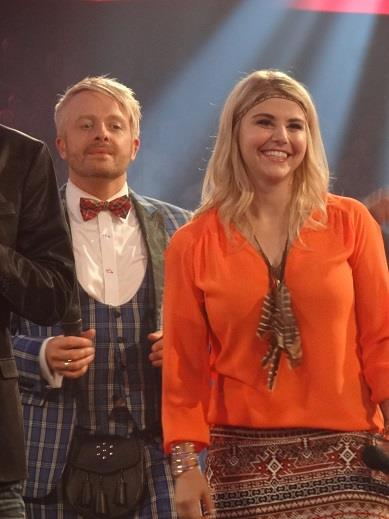
Egli alongside Ross Antony in 2015

In May 2013, she released her studio album "Glücksgefühle" (Feelings of Happiness), which debuted at number two in the album charts in Germany, Austria, and Switzerland. The album topped the Swiss Albums Chart and made it to number 2 in both Germany and Austria. The album sold over 450,000 records in those three countries. In its second week of sales, the album reached number one in the Swiss charts, and in August, it was certified platinum in Switzerland. Her album and single were also certified gold in Germany, just four weeks after her DSDS victory. In 2013, she also engaged in a tour to promote the album. Her second single, "Jetzt und hier für immer" (Now And Here Forever) was released in August 2013.

In November 2013, the next studio album, "Pure Lebensfreude" (Pure Joy of Life), was released. It again reached number one in Switzerland and the top ten in Austria and Germany. The first single "Verrückt nach Dir" (Crazy About You) also charted in all three countries.

In March 2014, the second single, "Irgendwann" (Sometime) from her album, "Pure Lebensfreude," was released and also charted. In April 2014, Dieter Bohlen announced that he would no longer be producing Egli's music.

On 24 October 2014, she released her next studio album "Bis hier und viel weiter" (Up To Here and Much Further), which was recorded in Berlin, without the co-operation of Dieter Bohlen. The first single was " Auf die Plätze, fertig, ins Glück!" (Ready, Set, Go For Happiness!), and the video was filmed in New York City. From early November, Egli embarked on her "Pure Lebensfreude" tour. The album reached number one in Switzerland again. The next single from the album was "Wir leben laut" (We Live Loud), and the video was from her tour through Germany, Switzerland, and Austria.

A gold edition of "Bis hier und viel weiter" was released in July 2015. This edition features six new songs, including the new single "Ohne Worte" (Without Words).

From early November 2014 to January 2015, Egli went on a tour.

In the summer of 2015 and 2016, Egli ran her own show called Die große Show der Träume on ARD and SRF. But due to low ratings, the program was dropped after just two episodes.

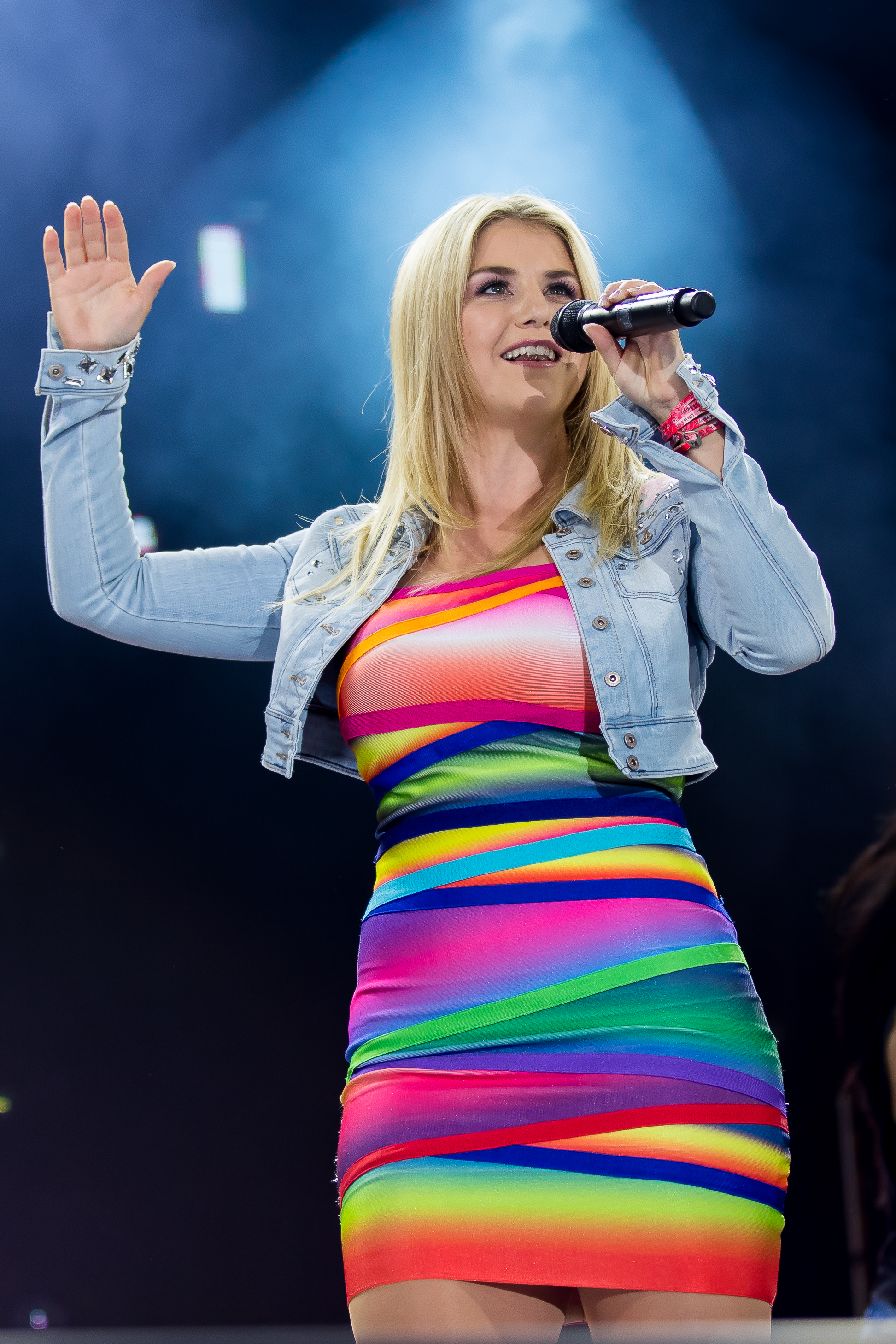
Egli in 2016.

Her next album, "Kick im Augenblick" (Kick In The Moment), was released on 8 April 2016. It comprises 19 tracks including a medley of songs from her previous album, Bis hierher und viel weiter. In addition, she appeared in many television shows and hosted some programs on ZDF, MDR, and SRF.

The album "Wohlfühlgarantie" (Well-being Guarantee) was released in 16 March 2018. It holds 21 tracks, with the final track, "Alperose", sung in the Swiss German dialect. To promote the album before its release, she released four tracks: "Herz an" (Heart On), "Keiner küsst mich" (Nobody Kisses Me), "Mein Ein und Alles" (My One and Everything), and "Verliebt, verlobt, verflixt nochmal" (In Love, Engaged, Darn It). "Herz an" and "Verliebt, verlobt, verflixt nochmal" both came along with music videos. Egli went on tour to promote the album starting in October 2018.

After a two-month stay in Australia, the album "Natürlich" (Naturally), which she had recorded there, was released in June 2019. The album reached number one in Switzerland. It was her fifth number one album in the country.

She then planned to go on tour again, but it was cancelled due to the COVID-19 pandemic. In May 2020, Egli parted ways with her longtime manager Volker Neumüller. Also in 2020, she released the album "Mini Schwiiz, mini Heimat".

In September 2021, her studio album "Alles was du braucht" (Everything You Need) reached the top spot in Germany for the first time and for the sixth time in Switzerland. This album was her last as a Universal Music Group artist.

== Recent years ==
Egli's signature

Since 2022, she has hosted "Die Beatrice Egli Show" (The Beatrice Egli Show), the successor to the SWR Saturday evening show SWR Schlager – Die Show, which she hosted together with Alexander Klaws.

In 2023, Egli departed UMG and switched to Ariola, a record label owned by the music branch of Sony, and at the new label she released the duet "Das wissen nur wir" (Only We Know) with Florian Silbereisen, written and composed by Eric Philippi. The album, Balance, released in June 2023, reached number one in Germany and Switzerland, just like her previous album.

In 2025, she performed a version of "Cheri Cheri Lady" by Modern Talking at the Die Beatrice Egli Show together with Thomas Anders, the other member of the German pop duo. However, in this performance, the two original verses were replaced by German language ones, but the chorus remained the same, in English. In the first verse, Anders recalled the 1980s as an era defined by excess and color, evoking imagery of flamboyance, spectacle, and commercial success. Egli responded by positioning herself as someone who knows this period only through stories (as she was born in 1988, one year after the first breakup of Modern Talking), expressing both curiosity and admiration for a time she did not personally experience, which she characterized as wild and unrestrained. The verse concluded with Anders saying the world sang the song. The second verse shifted focus from nostalgia to endurance. Egli portrayed Anders as immortal in a metaphorical sense, emphasizing how his work has survived the passage of time. Anders replied with humility, describing longevity in music as a gift. Egli then closed the second verse.

Also in 2025, Egli released the album "Hör nie auf damit" (Never Stop).

== Discography ==
=== Studio albums ===
- Sag mir wo wohnen die Engel (2007)
- Wenn der Himmel es so will (2008)
- Feuer und Flamme (2011)
- Glücksgefühle (2013)
- Pure Lebensfreude (2013)
- Bis hierher und viel weiter (2014)
- Kick im Augenblick (2016)
- Wohlfühlgarantie (2018)
- Natürlich! (2019)
- Mini Schwiiz, mini Heimat (2020)
- Alles was du brauchst (2021)
- Balance (2023)
- Hör nie auf damit (2025)

== Television appearances and presentations ==
- 2013: Unter uns (Among us) (RTL) – 2 episodes
- 2015: Beatrice Egli – Ein Frühlingstag in Rom (A spring day in Rome) (ZDF)
- since 2015: Beatrice Egli – Meine Schweiz, meine Musik (My Switzerland, my music) (MDR)
- 2015–2016: Beatrice Egli – Die grosse Show der Träume (The great show of dreams) (Das Erste)
- 2015: Beatrice Egli – Ein Herbsttag in Stockholm (An autumn day in Stockholm) (ZDF)
- 2016: Beatrice Egli – Ein Frühlingstag in Venedig (A spring day in Venice) (ZDF)
- 2016: Beatrice Egli – Ein Herbsttag in Wien (An autumn day in Vienna) (ZDF)
- 2017: Beatrice Egli – Kick im Augenblick Live (Kick in the moment Live) (MDR)
- 2017: Beatrice Egli – Ein Frühlingstag in der Schweiz (A spring day in Switzerland) (ZDF)
- 2018: Sturm der Liebe (Storm of Love) (Das Erste) – 3 episodes
- 2019: Freundinnen – Jetzt erst recht (Girlfriends – Now More Than Ever) (RTL, Guest role)
- 2019: Schlager sucht Liebe (Schlager seeks love) (RTL)
- 2019: Playmobil: The Movie (Synchronisation Die Gute Fee (The Good Fairy) )
- 2020: CATCH! Die Europameisterschaft im Fangen (The European Championship in Tag) (Sat.1)
- 2020: MasterChef Celebrity (Sky One)
- 2020: Hirschhausens Quiz des Menschen (Hirschhausen's Quiz of Humanity) (Das Erste)
- 2020: SWR Schlager – Die Show (with Alexander Klaws)
- 2021: Sing meinen Song – Das Schweizer Tauschkonzert (The Swiss Exchange Concert) (TV24)
- 2021: SWR Schlager – Die Show (SWR)
- since 2022: Die Beatrice Egli Show (SWR and MDR)
- 2022: Die Große Schlagerstrandparty (The Big Schlager Beach Party) (MDR, BR, WDR, ORF)
- 2022: Die Schlager des Sommers 2022 – Die Märchenschloss-Nacht (The hits of summer 2022 – The fairytale castle night) (MDR)
- 2022: Denn sie wissen nicht, was passiert (Because they don't know what will happen) (RTL)
- 2023: The Masked Singer (Gast)
- 2024: Verstehen Sie Spaß? (Do you understand fun?) (Das Erste and ORF)
- 2024: Deutschland sucht den Superstar - Jury (RTL)

== Awards ==
=== Echo ===
- 2014: for Newcomer des Jahres (international) (Newcomer of the year)

=== Prix Walo ===
- 2014: for Schlager

=== Swiss Music Awards ===
- 2015: Best female Solo Act
- 2017: Best female Solo Act
- 2021: Best female Solo Act

=== Smago! Award ===
- 2017: Switzerland's most successful Schlager export and multi-talented artist
- 2018: "Wellness for the Soul" Award
- 2021: Most successful new 'Best Of' album of the year (Bunt – Best Of)
