= Think About the Way (Groove Coverage song) =

Single by Groove Coverage featuring Rameez

from the album Riot on the Dancefloor
- Released: March 16, 2012
- Recorded: 2011
- Genre: Dance
- Length: 3:13
- Label: Suprime Records; Sony Music Entertainment
- Songwriters: Roberto Zanetti; I Campbell
- Producers: Axel Konrad; Ole Wierk; Verena Rehm

Groove Coverage singles chronology
"Angeline" (2011)	"Think About the Way" (2012)	"Riot on the Dancefloor" (2012)

Rameez singles chronology
"Think About the Way (Groove Coverage feat. Rameez)" (2011)	"My Party (DJane HouseKat feat. Rameez)" (2011)

Music video
- "Think About the Way" on YouTube

"Think About the Way" is a single by German dance band Groove Coverage featuring vocals / rap from Rameez. The single was released digitally on March 16, 2012, in Germany as the third single from their fourth studio album Riot on the Dancefloor. The song was written by Roberto Zanetti and produced by Axel Konrad, Ole Wierk, Verena Rehm.

== Adaptation ==
Parts of the song including the refrain are taken from an earlier 1994 hit by British hip-house / Eurodance artist Ice MC entitled "Think About the Way". The Ice MC dance hit had featured Alexia on vocals. The song had been an international hit for Ice MC (real name Ian Campbell) with top 10 appearances in Belgium, Italy and Switzerland, and top 20 showing in France, Germany, Netherlands and Sweden and made it to number 38 in the UK Top 40 charts.

Groove Coverage's release contains however some additional lyrics not found in the original Ice MC hit making it a new song rather than a straight cover of the original.

== Music video ==
A music video to accompany the release of "Think About the Way" was first released onto YouTube on 6 March 2012 at a total length of three minutes and forty-seven seconds.

== Track listing ==
Digital download
No.	Title	Length
1.	"Think About the Way" (Single Edit)	3:13
2.	"Think About the Way" (Club Mix)	4:40
3.	"Think About the Way" (Extended Version)	4:38
4.	"Think About the Way" (Rob & Chris Remix)	4:55
5.	"Think About the Way" (DJane HouseKat Remix)	4:01

== Chart performance ==
Chart (2012)	Peak position
Germany (Media Control AG)	54

== Release history ==
Country	Date	Format	Label
Germany	March 16, 2012	Digital download	Suprime Records, Sony Music Entertainment
