= Earth Moving (song) =

Single by Mike Oldfield

from the album Earth Moving
- Released: July 1989 (UK)
- Genre: Pop, progressive rock
- Length: 4:02
- Label: Virgin
- Songwriter(s): Mike Oldfield
- Producer(s): Mike Oldfield; Daniel Lazerus

Mike Oldfield singles chronology
"Flying Start" (1988)	"Earth Moving" (1989)	"Innocent" (1989)

"Earth Moving" is a single by musician Mike Oldfield, released in 1989. It is from the album of the same name. "Earth Moving" features Nikki Lamborn on vocals.

== Artwork ==
The single artwork was by Storm Thorgerson and Colin Chambers, with a photo by Andy Earl. The location for the photoshoot was Studio Tank in west London using a Bronica 6x7 daylight ektachrome. The single artwork is very similar to the album artwork.

== Music video ==
The "Earth Moving" music video is available on the Elements – The Best of Mike Oldfield video and features numerous visual references to the planet earth and rubbish.

== Track listing ==
1. "Earth Moving" (Disco Version) – 4:02
2. "Earth Moving" – 4:04
3. "Bridge to Paradise" – 4:37

== Charts ==
Chart (1989)	Peak position
UK Singles Chart	93
