= My Party =

Single by DJane HouseKat featuring Rameez
- Released: March 19, 2012
- Recorded: 2011
- Genre: Dance-pop
- Length: 2:59
- Label: Sony Music Entertainment
- Songwriters: Axel Konrad; Alvin J. Fields; Michael James Zager; Chima Rameez Okpalaugo
- Producers: Axel Konrad; Verena Rehm

Rameez singles chronology
"Think About the Way (Groove Coverage feat. Rameez)" (2012)	"My Party (DJane HouseKat feat. Rameez)" (2012)	"Out of Control (Bodybangers feat. Rameez)"

"My Party" is the debut single by German female singer, DJ and musician DJane HouseKat featuring vocals from Rameez. The single was released digitally on March 19, 2012 in Germany. The song was written by Axel Konrad, Alvin J. Fields, Michael James Zager and Chima Rameez Okpalaugo (Rameez). It is based on the 1978 Michael Zager Band hit "Let's All Chant".

== Music video ==
A music video to accompany the release of "My Party" was first released onto YouTube on 23 January 2012 at a total length of three minutes and nineteen seconds.

== Track listing ==
Digital download
No.	Title	Length
1.	"My Party" (Radio Version)	2:59
2.	"My Party" (Club Mix)	4:14
3.	"My Party" (Groove Coverage Remix)	4:08
4.	"My Party" (Music Video)	3:10

== Chart performance ==
Chart (2012)	Peak position
Austria (Ö3 Austria Top 40)	3
Denmark (Tracklisten)	37
Germany (Media Control AG)	4
Switzerland (Schweizer Hitparade)	14

=== Year-end charts ===
Chart (2012)	Position
Germany (Media Control AG)	89

== Release history ==
Country	Date	Format	Label
Germany	March 19, 2012	Digital download	Sony Music Entertainment
