= Yahoo Calendar =

Web calendar service

- Developer(s): Yahoo!
- Initial release: August 17, 1998; 26 years ago
- Operating system: Any (web-based application)
- Type: Electronic calendar
- Website: calendar.yahoo.com

Yahoo Calendar is a Web-based calendar service from Yahoo!. It can read calendar feeds and events syndicated from sites that make use of the published Yahoo calendar programming interfaces. While users are not required to have a Yahoo Mail account, they are required to have a Yahoo ID in order to use the software. It is one of the largest online calendar providers and serves millions of users.

== Features ==
Yahoo Calendar has the following features:

- 100-year calendar
- Various alarm features which allow you to send messages to numerous sources including:
  - Mobile devices
  - Yahoo Messenger
- The ability to sync your calendar with those of Palm devices and Microsoft Office Outlook, CalDAV, iPhone Calendarand some SyncML enabled [http://go.yahoo.com/next/devices_syncml cellphones
- Sharing of schedules between users. The mechanism allows several different methods of sharing including publicly sharing your calendar, sharing your calendar with a specific Yahoo Group, and sharing your calendar with a particular Yahoo! user.
- Automatically read, integrate, and republish public and personal events syndicated from Eventful, Upcoming, Evite, Bookwhen, and other sites.

Events are stored in the cloud. Calendar sharing is also available.

== The New Yahoo Calendar ==
In October 2008 Yahoo launched Yahoo Calendar Beta to the public.

It featured a completely redesigned interface similar to the All-New Yahoo Mail. It also includes support for open standards, support for subscriptions to any iCalendar-based public calendar, Flickr integration, drag & drop functionality and Outlook auto-sync.

It was released as a stable version in November 2010.

== See also ==
- Google Calendar
- 30 Boxes
- Cozi Central
- Eventful
- Evite
- iCalendar
