= Cozi Central =

- Developer: Cozi
- Stable release: 2.0
- Operating system: Browser based, PC version available
- Type: Family software, Electronic calendar
- Website: www.cozi.com

Cozi Central is a free Software as a service Web 2.0-based web application targeted at families offered by Cozi. It includes a family calendar, shopping list management, a screen saver with integrated appointment reminders, and Cozi Messages, which allows family members to quickly exchange text messages and email. It became available on September 25, 2006.

== Features ==
Cozi Central includes a color-coded calendar which helps family members coordinate schedules. The design assumes that one OR two adults are running the household, and has a "hand off this appointment" feature. Upcoming appointments appear on the integrated photo screen saver.

The shopping list feature lets family members access their shopping lists from mobile phones by sending a text message with the word "shopping" to BCOZI or 22694 (US only), or by calling an IVR system at 1-888-808-COZI.

Cozi Messages allows families to quickly send a short message by either text message or email, or both, to all family members.

On April 4, 2007, Cozi released a public beta of a toolbar, that synchronizes the Cozi calendar with Microsoft Outlook.

== Compatibility ==
Cozi Central runs as both a PC application and a Web site. The PC application requires Windows XP SP2 or Windows Vista. The Web Access version requires Microsoft Internet Explorer 6 or Mozilla Firefox 1.0+.

== See also ==
- Google Calendar
- Yahoo! Calendar
