= 30 Boxes =

Calendar website

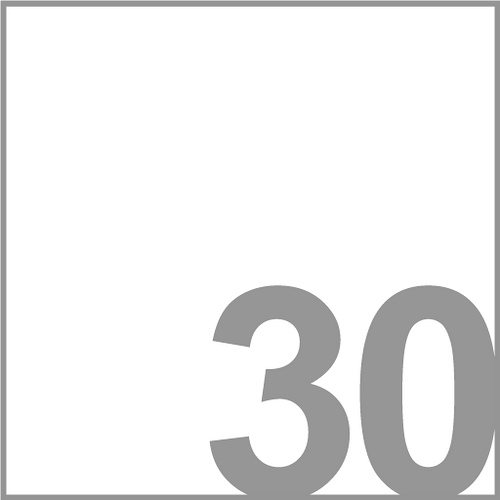
- Website type: Calendar
- Available in: English
- Owner: 83 Degrees
- Creators: Narendra Rocherolle; Nick Wilder; Julie Davidson
- Website: 30boxes.com
- Registration: Required
- Launched: March 2006
- Current status: Online

30 Boxes is a minimalist calendaring IOS application created by 83 Degrees. Originating as a web application in March 2006, 30 Boxes was founded by Webshots cofounder Narendra Rocherolle. The website shut down some time in 2020, but relaunched for the IOS in February 2021.

The original website was tailored towards "social media junkies".

== Reception ==
Barry Collins of The Sunday Times appreciated the website's plain-language event adding feature, but did not appreciate that he was unable to see more than one month of events at a time. Collins was also unhappy that the website was not capable of warning him when he had two events scheduled at the same time. In a list of the best web-based calendar software for small businesses, Forbes ranked 30 Boxes second, after Google Calendar. They described 30 Boxes like “buying a new car with manual transmission and lots of extras—you don't just want to drive it, you want to fool around with it to see what it can do”.
