= Viva Colonia =

2003 song and album by De Höhner

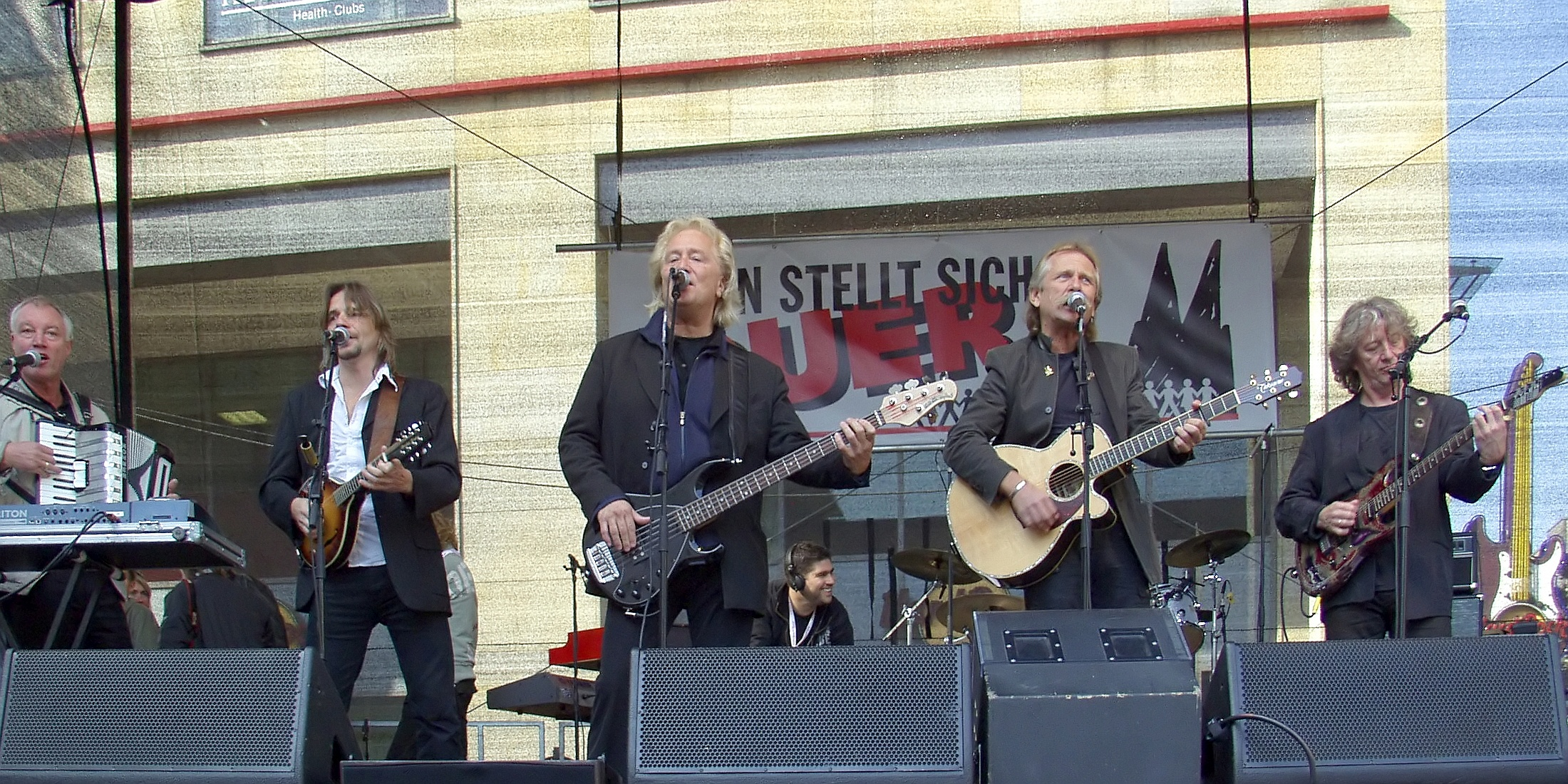
- De Höhner

Song by De Höhner

from the album Viva Colonia
- Released: 2003
- Genre: Pop rock
- Length: 3:10
- Label: Electrola

"Viva Colonia" (German pronunciation: [ˈviːvaː koˈloːni̯a], "Live Cologne") is a 2003 song and album by the German band De Höhner. The song is sung in a language which resembles the local Ripuarian dialect of Cologne, the Kölsch, but differs in that the lyrics and refrain do not have many particularly Kölsch words; the last two lines of the catchy refrain are written in Standard German. Thus the text is relatively easily understood by all German-language speakers.

The song's Latin title refers to the city of Cologne, whose old Latin name is Colonia. The song is especially popular at carnival time, but can be heard throughout the country the year, not solely in Cologne. For example in Munich, (Bavaria), during carnival and Oktoberfest the song is heard with "Viva Bavaria!" as substitution for "Viva Colonia!".

The football team 1. FC Köln and ice hockey team Kölner Haie, both from Cologne, play the song frequently during their games.

== See also ==
- Cologne Carnival
