= Webshots =

Photo wallpaper and screensaver service

- Company type: Subsidiary
- Founded: San Diego, California (September 1995)
- Founder: Andrew Laakmann; Danna Stillman; Nick Wilder; Narendra Rocherolle
- Services: Photo/Video hosting service
- Owner: Threefold Photos, Inc.
- Website: webshots.com

Webshots is a photo wallpaper and screensaver service owned and operated by Threefold Photos. It was also a photo sharing service from 1999 to 2012.

== History ==
Webshots was created in 1995 by Auralis, Inc. in San Diego, California. It was initially a sports oriented screensaver sold at retail for desktop computers. Founders Andrew Laakmann, Danna Stillman, Nick Wilder, and Narendra Rocherolle migrated the desktop software to the Web and became one of the earliest instances of photo sharing found online. The Webshots Community launched in 1999 as the first photo sharing website with an emphasis on public sharing.

In October 1999, Webshots was sold to Excite@Home for $82.5 million in stock. The service continued to grow and when Excite@Home declared bankruptcy at the end of 2001, the Webshots assets were purchased back by the founders for $2.5 million in cash.

By 2001 Webshots became a profitable company with a combination of revenue streams that included advertising, freemium service, and merchandising. By 2004, Webshots was grossing $15M/year, had more than 200,000 paid subscribers, and was the #1 photo sharing site and top 50 media property per ComScore. In the same year, Alexa ranked Webshots the second largest English language privately held Web media property (behind weather.com). The company was sold to CNET Networks for $71 million in cash. During this period, new photo sharing services began to emerge to service different markets. Flickr became popular with bloggers. Facebook photos took over at universities. Photobucket became the default service on MySpace and SmugMug carved out a paid service for family albums and professional photographers.

In autumn of 2007, CNET sold Webshots to American Greetings for $45 million in cash. Webshots joined the American Greetings Interactive unit and was reunited with another former Excite@Home property—the eCard website Blue Mountain.

In October 2012, American Greetings sold Webshots to Threefold Photos, Inc. The image hosting service was shut down two months later on December 1. Webshots relaunched as a photo sharing service called Smile by Webshots, but the service no longer exists. In May 2013, Threefold Photos introduced Webshots Wallpaper & Screensaver, a nod to the original service, which is a desktop application for Windows and macOS and comes with a sampler of free high-resolution professional photos. Subscribers have access to over 5,000 images, with new images published daily. Webshots also offers an app for Android and iOS.

== Webshots business models ==
Webshots has been in business since 1995 and has derived revenue from various services, including banner advertising, paid sponsorships, software bundling, branded downloads, client software advertising, co-registration deals, software sales, premium memberships, and print and gift merchandise sales. In 2010 American Greetings bundled Kiwee Toolbar with the Webshots Desktop and generated some complaints and controversy because of the toolbar's labeling as malware. It was unbundled in 2011.

Webshots currently offers a free trial software version and a premium service (with monthly and annual options) which offers subscribers two new professional photos a day and complete access to a gallery of professional photos. Some pages of the webshots.com website also serve advertisements.

== See also ==
- Image hosting service
- Image sharing

Similar services

- Flickr, a popular Image hosting service with over 100 million registered members and 10 billion images. Flickr gives its free members 1 terabyte of space to upload content.
