= Höhner =

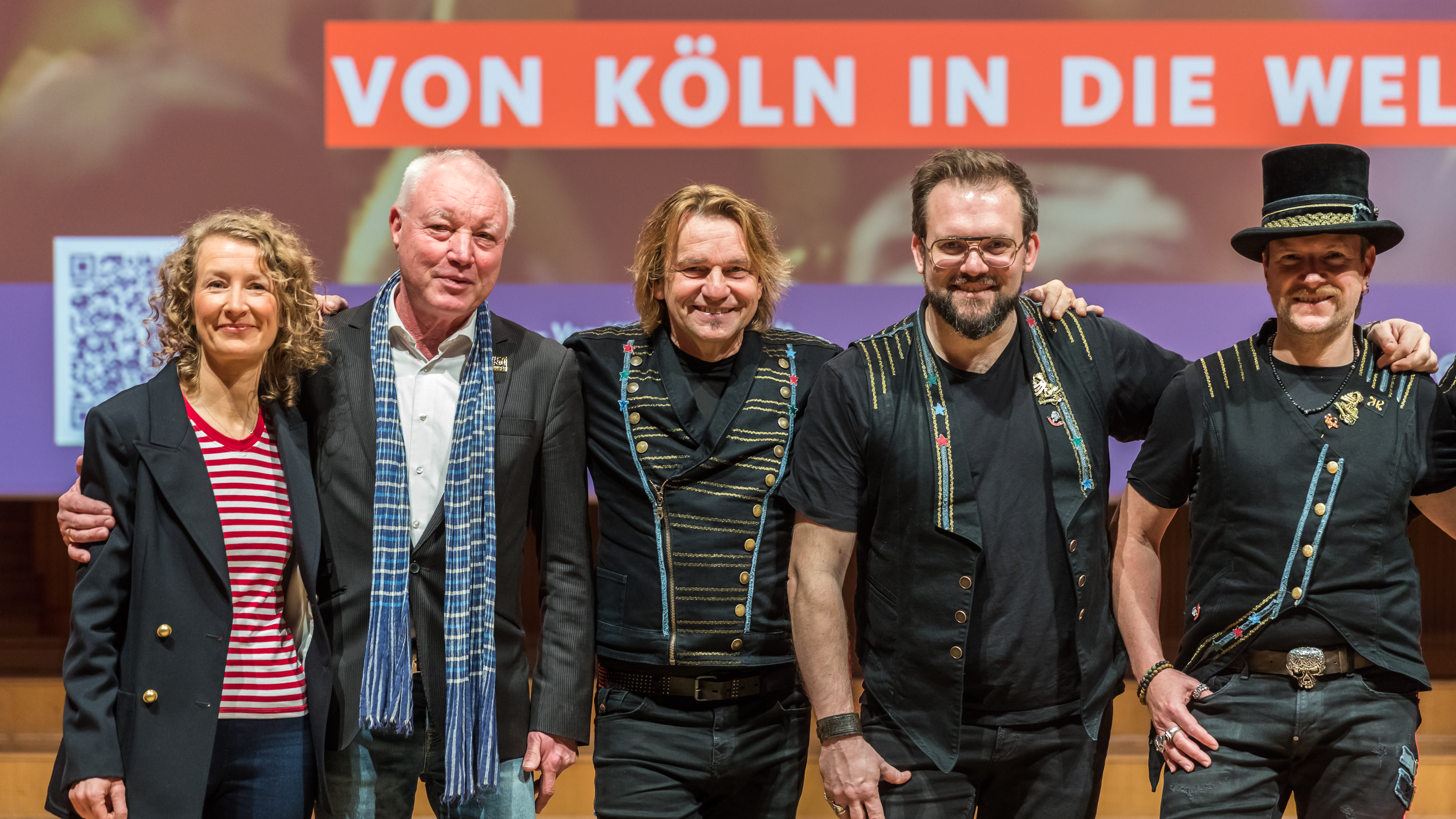

Background information
- Also known as: Hühner, De Höhner
- Origin: Cologne, North Rhine-Westphalia, Germany
- Genres: Kölsch, Carnival, Pop
- Years active: 1972–present

De Höhner (pronounced [də ˈhǿːnɐ]; Kölsch for 'The Chickens') is a band from Cologne, Germany, singing in the local Kölsch dialect.

The group was founded in 1972 by Peter Werner and Janus Fröhlich. During their first year, the band wore chicken costumes, and threw real feathers into the audience.

They are particularly successful in the area around Cologne, although they are popular nationwide. The band is famous for performing at the Cologne carnival. Their most popular carnival songs are "Echte Fründe", "Pizza wunderbar", "Die Karawane zieht weiter" and "Viva Colonia".

Their song "Wenn nicht jetzt, wann dann?" (If not now, then when?) reached number one in Germany in February 2007. They performed it during the 2007 World Men's Handball Championship finals, held in Cologne.

Their album Da Simmer Dabei! Die Grössten Partyhits was on the German top 50 albums chart for 8 weeks in 2007, peaking at number 9. The title is a reference to the chorus of the song "Viva Colonia".

== Discography ==
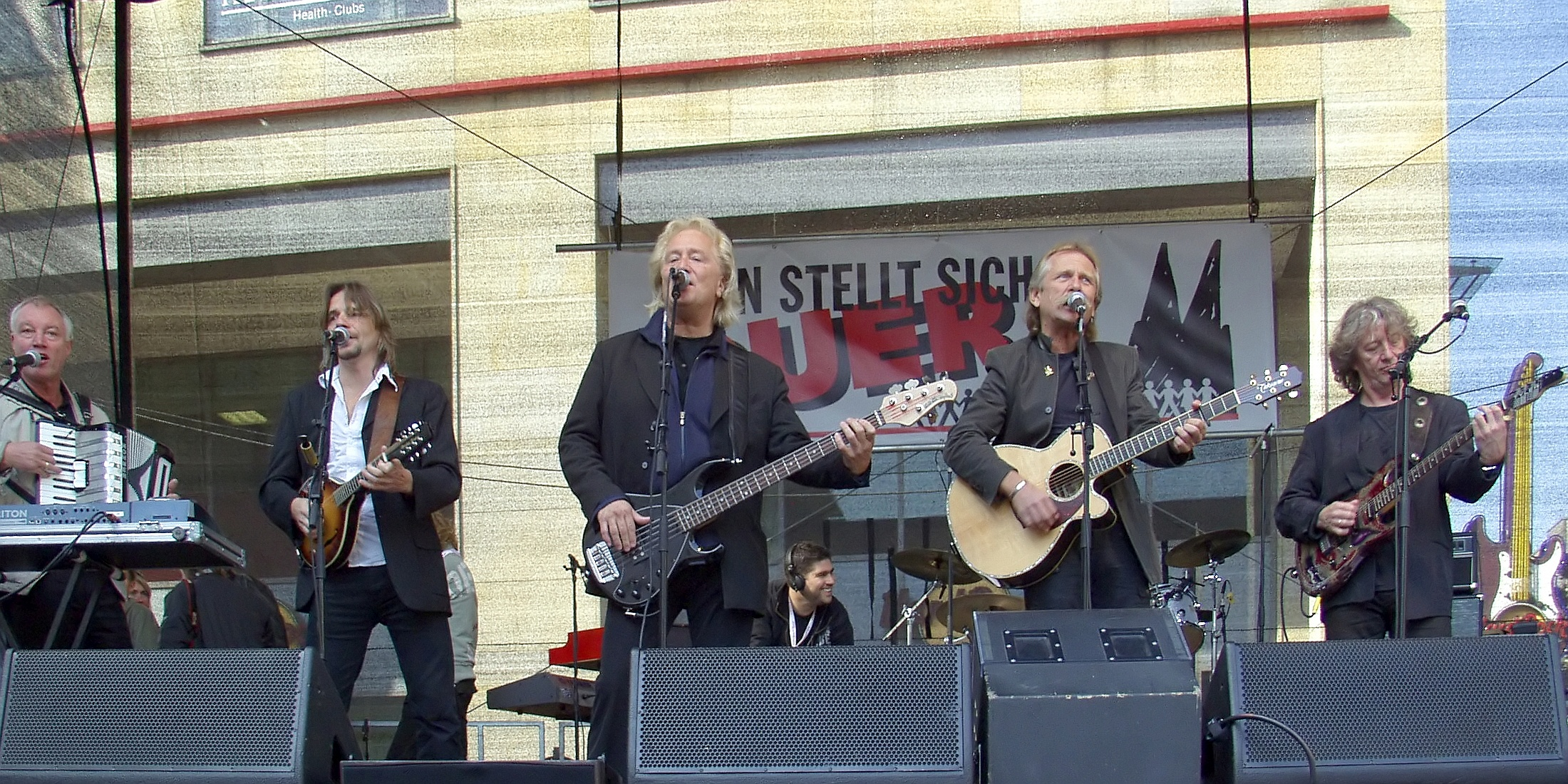
Höhner, 2008

Partly in German, partly in Ripuarian language

=== Albums ===
- I well noh hus (1978)
- Verzäll doch noch ens (1979)
- Lang usjebröt, Doppel-LP (1979)
- Die größten Erfolge (1979)
- Clown (1980)
- Näl met Köpp (1981)
- Ich ben ne Räuber, LP (1982)
- Schlawiner (1983)
- Op Jöck (1984)
- Echte kölsche Ton (19??)
- 10 Johr Stimmung us Kölle (1986)
- Für dich (1987)
- Guck mal (1988)
- Wenn's dir gut geht (1989)
- Leider gut (1990)
- 10 Johr Stimmung (1990)
- Kumm loss mer fierre – Live (1991)
- Höhner Aktuell (1992)
- Dat es ne jode Lade (1993)
- Dat fings do nor he ... Höhner Classic (1993)
- Wartesaal der Träume (1994)
- Höhner Classic (1994)
- Ich ben ne Räuber CD (1995)
- Made In Kölle (1996)
- Weihnacht' doheim un' üvverall (1996)
- Fünfundzwanzig Jahre ... Kult 2CD (1997)
- Best Of (25 Jahre) (1998)
- Die Karawane zieht weiter (1998)
- Classic Gold (1999)
- 2, 3, 4, (2001)
- Höhner Rockin' Roncalli Show Rheinland des Lächelns, CD/DVD (2001)
- Die ersten 30 Jahre (2002)
- Classic Andante (2003)
- Viva Colonia (2004)
- Fröher Vol. 1 1983–1984 Schlawiner/Op Jöck, Doppel-CD (2005)
- Fröher Vol. 2 1987–1988 Für dich/Guck mal, Doppel-CD (2005)
- Fröher Vol. 3 1989–1990 Wenn’s dir gut geht/Leider gut, Doppel-CD (2005)
- Da simmer dabei! Die größten Partyhits (2005)
- 6:0 (2005)
- Here we go (2006)
- Höhner Live on Tour (2007)
- Da simmer dabei! Die größten Partyhits (Gold Edition) (2007)
- Wenn nicht jetzt, wann dann? Doppel-CD (2007)
- Jetzt und Hier (Nov. 2007)
- Nase vorn (2008)
- Himmelhoch High (2009)
- Höhner 4.0 (2012)
- Mach laut (2014)
- Alles op Anfang (2016)
- Wir sind für die Liebe gemacht (2018)
- Weihnacht 3 (2018)
- 50 Jahre – 50 Hits (2022)

=== Singles ===
- "Jrillparty" / "Et jeiht nix üvver Ostermann" (1972)
- "Höhnerhoff Rock" / "Ich liebe Dich wie Apfelmus" (1976)
- "Unsre Bock es Meister" / "Kater Blues" (1978)
- "Blootwoosch, Kölsch un e lecker Mädche" (1978)
- "Ich bin ne Räuber" (1979)
- "Minge Dom, ich ben stolz op dich" (1980)
- "Winke, winke" (1981)
- "Dat Hätz vun dr Welt" (1982)
- "En Villa an dr Ville" (1984)
- "Ich han Trone in de Auge" (1985)
- "Pizza wundaba" (1987)
- "Scirocco in Marokko" (1988)
- "Kein Meer mehr da" (1988)
- "Küsschen" (1990)
- "Festa Italiana (Fußball wundaba)" (1990) (reinterpretation of "Pizza wundaba" for the 1990 FIFA World Cup)
- "Kumm los mer fiere" (1991)
- "Hey Kölle, Du bes e Jeföhl" (1992)
- "Nemm mich su wie ich ben" (1992)
- "Wartesaal der Träume" (1994)
- "Met Breef un Siejel" (1996)
- "Die Karawane zieht weiter" (1998)
- "Jetzt gehts los" (1998)
- "Mer ston zo dir FC Kölle" (1998)
- "Lenya" (1999)
- "Die längste Karnevalssingle der Welt" (1999)
- "Immer freundlich lächlen" (2000)
- "Dicke Mädchen haben schöne Namen" (2001)
- "Liebchen" (2001)
- "Sansibar" (2001)
- "Viva Colonia" (2003)
- "Viva Colonia" (2003) (1.FC Köln Edition)
- "Viva Colonia" (2003) (Die Remixe)
- "Alles was ich will" (2004)
- "Länger" (2004)
- "Ohne Dich geht es nicht" (2005)
- "Here We Go!" (2006)
- "Dä kölsche Pass" (2007)
- "Wenn nicht jetzt, wann dann?" (2007) (official song to World Men's Handball Championship 2007 in Germany)
- "Schenk mir dein Herz" (2009)
- "Stand Up (For The Champions)" (Feat. Right Said Fred) (2010)
- "Viva Südafrika" (Feat. Right Said Fred) (2010)
- "6 bis 8 Stunden Schlaf" (2011)
- "Ävver et Hätz bliev he in Kölle" (Feat. Stefan Raab) (2012)
- "Das geht nie vorbei" (2013)
- "Steh auf, mach laut!" (2014)
- "Kumm los mer danze" (2015)
- "Wir sind für die Liebe gemacht" (2017)
- "Wir halten die Welt an (Remix)" (2018)
- "Prinzessin" (2023)

=== DVD ===
- Höhner Rockin' Roncalli Show Rheinland des Lächelns, CD/DVD (2001)
- Höhner Rockin' Roncalli Show Minsche Fiere Emotionen, DVD (2003)
- Höhner Rockin' Roncalli Show SingSalaBim, DVD (2006)

=== Chart rankings ===
Singles

Die Karawane zieht weiter
DE: 12 – 02.02.1998 – 16 Weeks
Die Karawane zieht weiter (Remix)
DE: 38 – 25.01.1999 – 9 Weeks
Der liebe Gott weiß, dass ich kein Engel bin
DE: 67 – 15.02.1999 – 2 Weeks
Immer freundlich lächeln
DE: 64 – 07.02.2000 – 6 Weeks
Die längste Karnevalssingle der Welt
DE: 51 – 07.02.2000 – 7 Weeks
Dicke Mädchen haben schöne Namen
DE: 41 – 22.01.2001 – 9 Weeks
Sansi Bar
DE: 33 – 14.01.2002 – 8 Weeks
Viva Colonia
DE: 20 – 27.01.2003 – 35 Weeks
Alles was ich will
DE: 68 – 09.02.2004 – 5 Weeks
Länger
DE: 60 – 24.01.2005 – 5 Weeks
Ohne dich geht es nicht
DE: 61 – 23.01.2006 – 8 Weeks
Dä kölsche Pass
DE: 47 – 22.01.2007 – 9 Weeks
Wenn nicht jetzt, wann dann?
DE: 1 – 19.02.2007 – 7 Weeks
Mir kumme mit Allemann vorbei
DE: 48 – 18.01.2008 – 5 Weeks
Echte Fründe
DE: 75 – 08.02.2008 – 5 Weeks
NaJuCo Colonia
DE: 48 – 16.01.2009 – 8 Weeks
Schenk mir dein Herz
DE: 13 – 23.10.2009 – 23 Weeks
Viva Südafrika
DE: 54 – 18.06.2010 – 1 Week
Carneval
DE: 48 – 18.02.2011 – 2 Weeks
6 bis 8 Stunden Schlaf
DE: 67 – 18.11.2011 – 4 Weeks
Ävver et hätz bliev he in Kölle
DE: 38 – 23.11.2012 – 4 Weeks
Das geht nie vorbei
DE: 75 – 31.01.2014 – 3 Weeks
Steh auf, mach laut!
DE: 63 – 25.07.2014 – 3 Weeks
Prinzessin
DE: 46 – 24.02.2023 – 1 Week
