= Mini Schwiiz, mini Heimat =

Studio album by Beatrice Egli
- Released: 14 August 2020
- Length: 41:26
- Label: Universal
- Producer: Joachim Hans Wolf

Beatrice Egli chronology
| Natürlich! (2019) | Mini Schwiiz, mini Heimat (2020) | Bunt – Best of (2020) |

Mini Schwiiz, mini Heimat (transl. My Switzerland, My Home) is the tenth studio album by Swiss singer Beatrice Egli. It was released by Universal Music on 14 August 2020 in Switzerland. The album debuted and peaked at number one on the Swiss Albums Chart.

== Track listing ==
All tracks produced by Joachim Hans Wolf.

| No. | Title | Writer(s) | Original version | Length |
|---|---|---|---|---|
| 1. | "Du gisch mim Läbe en Sinn" | Oliver Lukas; Bernhard Wittgruber; Beatrice Egli; Joachim Hans Wolf | "Du gibst meinem Leben einen Sinn" | 3:24 |
| 2. | "Mini Schwiiz, mini Heimat" | Egli; Wolf | "Mein Ein und Alles" | 3:54 |
| 3. | "Vivila" | Amadeus Crotti; Lukas; Wolf; Hens Hensen | "Le li la" | 3:14 |
| 4. | "Terra Australia (Promets-moi de me faire revenir)" | Achim Radloff; Egli; Wolf; Katia Gökoglu | "Terra Australia" | 3:38 |
| 5. | "Bunt" | Egli; Wolf | "Bunt" | 3:08 |
| 6. | "Hopp oder topp" | Lukas; Mihael Hercog; Egli; Wolf | "Hopp oder topp" | 3:22 |
| 7. | "Verliebt, verlobt, verflixt nomal" | Frank Kretschmer; Thomas Remm; Marc Hiller; Egli; Wolf | "Verliebt, verlobt, verflixt nomal" | 3:15 |
| 8. | "Kick im Augeblick" | Hubert Molander; Egli; Wolf; Emanuel Treu | "Kick im Augeblick" | 3:27 |
| 9. | "Où es-tu?" | Egli; Wolf; Gökoglu | "Kompass" | 3:28 |
| 10. | "Natürlich!" | Egli; Wolf | "Natürlich!" | 2:54 |
| 11. | "Bello e impossibile" | Wolfgang Hofer; Crotti; Hensen | "Verboten gut" | 3:24 |
| 12. | "Dahei" | Radloff; Egli; Wolf | "Zuhaus" | 4:01 |

Gold edition
| No. | Title | Writer(s) | Original version | Length |
|---|---|---|---|---|
| 13. | "Siebe mal Herz, siebe mal Schmerz" | Lukas; Hercog; Egli; Wolf | "Sieben mal Herz, sieben mal Schmerz" | 3:33 |
| 14. | "Alles chan, gar nüt muess" | Lukas; Saša Lendero; Hercog; Egli; Wolf | "Alles kann, gar nichts muss" | 3:23 |
| 15. | "I.N.S.T.A." | Egli; Wolf | "I.N.S.T.A." | 4:01 |
| 16. | "Le 5ème élément" | Radloff; Gökoglu; Egli; Wolf | "Das 5. Element" | 4:54 |
| 17. | "Flüge" | Egli; Wolf | "Flüge" | 3:26 |
| 18. | "Ich stah zu dir" | Radloff; Egli; Wolf | "Ich steh zu dir" | 3:58 |
| 19. | "Mini Schwiiz, mini Heimat" (Instrumental) | Egli; Wolf | "Mein Ein und Alles" | 3:54 |

== Charts ==
=== Weekly charts ===
| Chart (2020) | Peak position |
|---|---|
| Swiss Albums (Schweizer Hitparade) | 1 |

=== Year-end charts ===
| Chart (2020) | Position |
|---|---|
| Swiss Albums (Schweizer Hitparade) | 13 |

== Release history ==
| Region | Date | Edition | Format | Label | Ref(s) |
|---|---|---|---|---|---|
| Various | 14 August 2020 | Standard | CD; digital download | Universal Music | |
| Various | 5 March 2021 | Gold | CD; digital download | Universal Music | |
