= Narendra Rocherolle =

American entrepreneur, designer, and software engineer

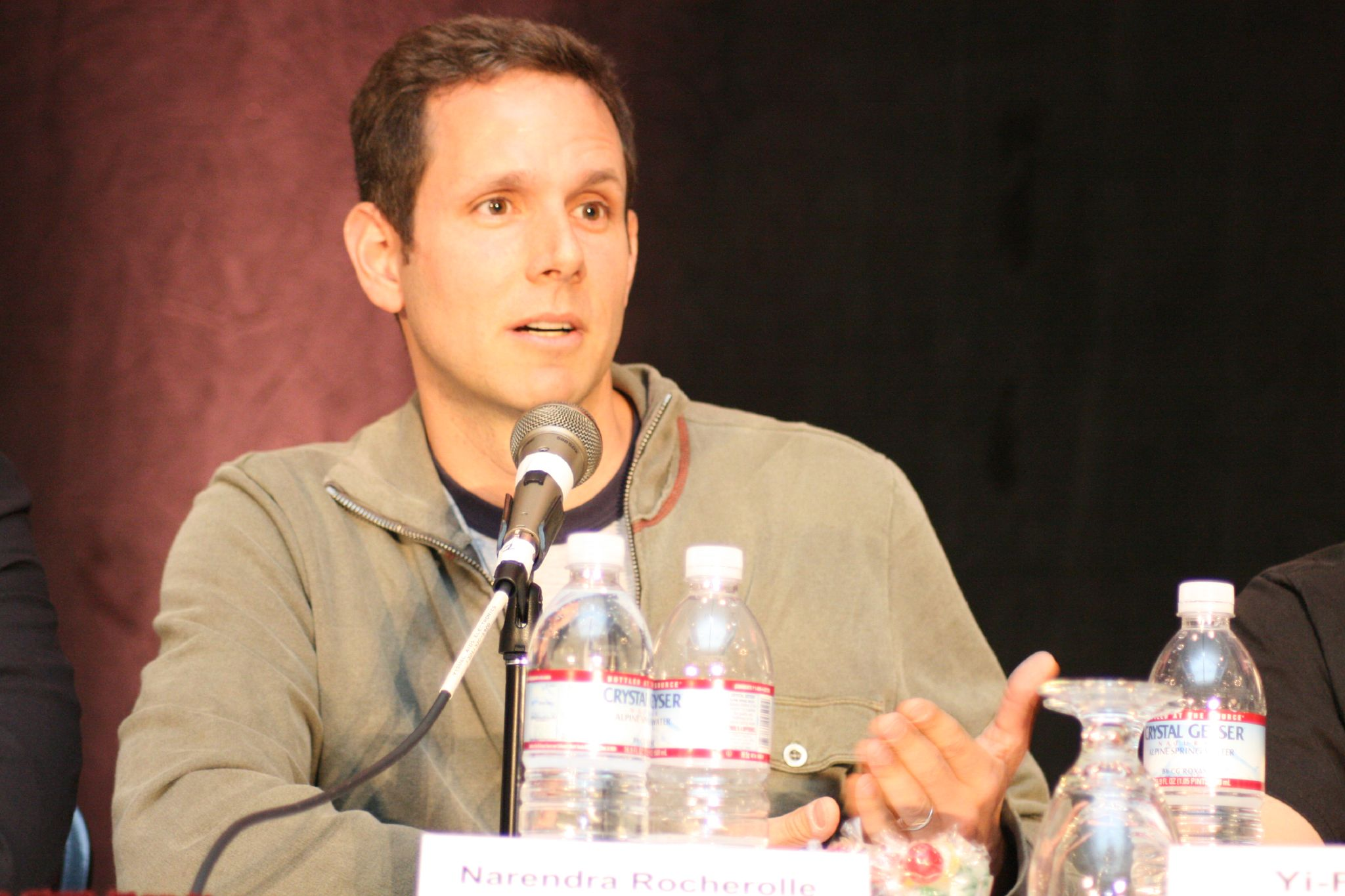
- Occupations: executive, software engineer, designer

Narendra Rocherolle is an American entrepreneur, designer, and software engineer.

Rocherolle was born in New York, New York, graduated from the King Low Heywood Thomas School, received a bachelor's degree from Princeton University in 1991 and a master's degree from Stanford University in 1994.

Rocherolle is President and Executive Chairman of Message Bus, an infrastructure applications company based in Mill Valley, California that he co-founded with Nick Wilder and Jeremy LaTrasse. He is also CEO of The Start Project, a consumer web incubator.

In 1996, Rocherolle, Andrew Laakmann and Nick Wilder co-founded Webshots, the first mainstream photo sharing service. He and his partners sold Webshots in 1999 to Excite@Home. They purchased the Webshots assets back from the Excite@Home bankruptcy in 2001 and eventually sold the company for a second time in 2004 to CNET Networks CNET sold it to American Greetings in 2007, and Rocherolle brought it back again in via his company Threefold Photos, Inc. in October 2012.

In 2006, Rocherolle, Wilder, and Julie Davidson co-founded the shared calendar and lifestream application 30 Boxes (a two-time Webby Finalist). The application is attributed as the first "newsfeed" sourcing various social sites to provide updates based around people.

Rocherolle served as an early advisor to Twitter and vocal evangelist. In 2007 at SxSW, he and Wilder wrote the first mobile web version of Twitter and were the first to embed media in timelines. He is credited with generating the first "retweet" and writing the first article about Twitter that appeared in the mainstream media. The article entitled, "Evan Willams is My Tamagotchi" was written for the technology news site GigaOm and then excerpted in Wired Magazine.

He and his partners have contributed to many areas of the social web. These include photo sharing, LAMP (software bundle), Asymmetric Follow, desktop applications using cloud storage, natural language processing, hover card social identity, remote CSS, activity feeds, webtop, friend recommendations, shared calendars, as well as profile and data sharing.

Rocherolle has written for GigaOm, TechCrunch, and The Huffington Post.

Rocherolle is the grandson of Lester Avnet, former CEO of the technology company Avnet. His uncle is movie producer and director Jon Avnet.
