= Rameez (rapper) =

Australian rapper

Chima Rameez Okpalaugo better known by his mononym Rameez is an Austrian rapper best known in Germany for being featured on 2011 hit "Think About the Way" by Groove Coverage (a cover of a same-titled original hit by ICE MC) and in "My Party", a hit by German DJane Housekat.

== Career ==
Born in Austria, the rapper Rameez appeared in Groove Coverage's album Riot on the Dancefloor with the song "Think About the Way". The song with rap section by Rameez became very popular in Germany reaching #6 on the Top 100 DJ list prompting its release as a single and the first official chart appearance for Rameez reaching number 54 on the official German Singles Chart Media Control Charts.

Based on this initial success, he was featured on another German act, called DJane Housekat in the song "My Party". Released initially as a single-track, it was released in March 2012 a single. The German TV station ProSieben featured the song in April 2012 as a theme song for its series Comedy Dienstag. The song sampled on the very well-known hit "Let's All Chant" from Michael Zager Band with additional lyrics plus a rap section by Rameez. The theme song generated huge attention and the song showing as top downloads the following week in Germany and Austria. Sony Music released it as a single "My Party" on 20 April 2012 reaching number 4 on official German Media Control Charts and at number 3 in Ö3 Austria Top 40. It also charted in Switzerland. He was also featured in the vocals of "Out Of Control" by the Bodybangers that also featured singing vocals of Linda Teodosiu. In 2013, he was featured in DJane Housekats' second single "All the Time".

== Discography ==
=== Singles ===
Year	Title	Peak Chart positions						Album
Year	Title	AUT	DEN	FRA	GER	POL	SUI	Album
2013	"La La La"	–	–	–	–	–	–	
2016	"Hello Summer"	–	–	–	–	30	–	

=== Featured in ===
Year	Title	Peak Chart positions						Album
Year	Title	AUT	DEN	FRA	GER	POL	SUI	Album
2012	"Think About the Way" (Groove Coverage feat. Rameez)	–	–	–	54	–	–	Groove Coverage album Riot on the Dancefloor
2012	"My Party" (DJane Housekat feat. Rameez)	3	25	–	4	–	14	
2012	"Out of Control" (Bodybangers feat. Linda Teodosiu and Rameez)	–	–	–	–	–	–	
2013	"All the Time" (DJane Housekat feat. Rameez)	29	–	–	44	–	–	
2014	"Girls in Luv" (DJane Housekat feat. Rameez)	–	–	67	–	8	–	
