= DJane HouseKat =

German singer, DJ and musician

- Born: 1988 (age 37–38)
- Origin: Ingolstadt, Germany
- Genres: Electropop, dance, techno
- Occupations: Singer, songwriter, disc-jockey, record producer
- Years active: 2010–present

Kathrin Kohlhepp (born 1988), known by her artistic name DJane HouseKat, is a German singer, DJ and musician specializing in electronic dance music. She is signed to Sony Music label.

== Biography ==
DJane HouseKat used to play at clubs under the name DJane Candy before she released her single "My Party" and changed her name to DJane HouseKat. She learned about the DJ Set from her ex-boyfriend.

She became internationally famous for her 2012 dance hit "My Party", featuring British rapper Rameez. It was produced by Axel Konrad including sampling from the Michael Zager Band classic "Let's All Chant". Released in January 2012, it soon caught up in all night venues and has charted in Germany, Austria, Switzerland, and the Scandinavian countries. Pro Sieben station broadcast "My Party" in April as a promotional song for the station's Comedy Dienstag (meaning Comedy Tuesday), with the song jumping to Top 5 both in Germany and Austria the following week.

== Discography ==
=== Singles ===
| Year | Title | Peak Chart Position | | | | | | | Album |
| Year | Title | GER | AUT | DEN | FRA | POL Airplay | POL Dance | SWI | Album |
|---|---|---|---|---|---|---|---|---|---|
| 2012 | "My Party" (feat. Rameez) | 4 | 3 | 25 | — | — | — | 14 | —N/a |
| 2013 | "All The Time" (feat. Rameez) | 44 | 29 | — | — | — | — | — | —N/a |
| 2013 | "Don't U Feel Alright" | 50 | 62 | — | — | — | — | — | —N/a |
| 2014 | "Girls in Luv" (with Rameez) | — | — | — | 67 | 8 | 5 | — | —N/a |
| 2015 | "Careless" (feat. Piñero) | — | — | — | — | — | — | — | —N/a |
| 2015 | "38 Degrees" (feat. Rameez) | — | — | — | — | — | 40 | — | —N/a |
| 2016 | "Ass up" (feat. Rameez) | — | — | — | — | — | 6 | — | —N/a |
| 2018 | "Listen" (feat. Lotus) | — | — | — | — | — | — | — | —N/a |
| 2021 | "Spirit of Yesterday" | — | — | — | — | — | — | — | —N/a |
| 2025 | "My Party" (with AXMO and Groove Coverage) | — | — | — | — | — | — | — | —N/a |

=== Remixes ===
- 2012: "Think About the Way" (Groove Coverage feat. Rameez)
- 2012: "Riot on the Dancefloor" (Groove Coverage)
