= Cozi =

American website and app

Cozi Group Inc.
- Type: Subsidiary
- Industry: Internet, computer software
- Founded: March 14, 2005, Seattle, Washington
- Headquarters: Seattle, United States
- Key people: Robbie Cape; (co-founder); Jan Miksovsky; (co-founder)
- Products: Productivity apps, Cozi Family Organizer
- Parent: OurFamilyWizard, LLC
- Website: www.cozi.com

Cozi is a family organization website and mobile app designed to streamline household management. It offers shared calendars, to-do lists, shopping lists, and messaging tools, allowing multiple users to coordinate under one account. Founded in 2005 by former Microsoft employees, Cozi has evolved through acquisitions and now operates under OurFamilyWizard. The app is available in both free and premium versions on iOS, Android, and desktop platforms.

== History ==
Cozi was founded in 2005 by Robbie Cape and Jan Miksovsky, two former Microsoft employees who sought to simplify family logistics with technology. The company's first product, Cozi Central, was released on September 25, 2006, and included a family calendar, shopping lists, family messaging and a photo collage screensaver. The company is based in Seattle, Washington.

Cozi has both a freemium version, and a paid version called Cozi Gold. Cozi Gold's additional features include Cozi Contacts, a birthday tracker, more reminders, mobile month view, and change notifications. The software can be used on desktop or mobile applications for iOS and Android.

On June 5, 2011, Cozi set a Guinness World Record for the longest line of ducks in a row. The line stretched for one mile and was made up of 17,782 rubber ducks.

Cozi was acquired by Time Inc. in 2014.

After the Meredith Corporation acquired Time in 2018, Cozi was moved into the Parents Network division.

On May 4, 2022, Cozi was acquired by OurFamilyWizard of Minneapolis, Minnesota, reporting more than 20 million registered users.
