= Best of Groove Coverage =

Compilation album by Groove Coverage
- Released: May 31, 2005
- Genre: Electronica
- Length: 65:48
- Label: Central Station

Groove Coverage chronology
Poison (EP) (2004)	Best of Groove Coverage (2005)	21st Century (2006)

Best of Groove Coverage is a compilation album by the German Euro-trance band Groove Coverage, released in May 2005.

== Track listing ==
1. "Moonlight Shadow"
2. "Poison"
3. "God Is a Girl"
4. "Runaway"
5. "7 Years and 50 Days"
6. "The End"
7. "She"
8. "Moonlight Shadow (Piano mix)"
9. "Remember"
10. "Million Tears"
11. "Beat Just Goes"
12. "Are U Ready?"
13. "Moonlight Shadow" (Warp Brothers remix)
14. "Poison" (Friday Night Posse remix)
15. "God Is A Girl" (Axel Konrad remix)
16. "The End" (Special D. remix)
