= Greatest Hits (Groove Coverage album) =

Groove Coverage Greatest Hits

Greatest hits album by Groove Coverage
- Released: November 2007
- Genre: Trance
- Label: Zeitgeist (Universal); Suprime:Music

Groove Coverage chronology
21st Century (2006)	Groove Coverage Greatest Hits (2007)	Riot on the Dancefloor (2012)

Greatest Hits is the fourth album by German trance group Groove Coverage and their first Greatest Hits album released in Germany. The first single from the album was "Because I Love You".

== Track listing ==
=== CD 1 ===
1. "Because I Love You" – 3:08
2. "7 Years and 50 Days" – 3:44
3. "Million Tears" – 3:13
4. "God Is A Girl" – 3:38
5. "Summer Rain" – 4:00
6. "Moonlight Shadow" – 2:52
7. "Nothing Lasts Forever" – 3:04
8. "The End" – 3:38
9. "Little June" – 3:38
10. "Poison" – 3:06
11. "Runaway" – 3:06
12. "Last Unicorn" – 3:54
13. "Angel From Above" – 3:10
14. "Living On A Prayer" – 3:19
15. "Call Me" – 3:34
16. "Holy Virgin" – 3:49

=== CD 2 ===
1. "Moonlight Shadow (Pure & Direct Version)" – 4:18
2. "She" – 3:51
3. "November Night" – 3:22
4. "Only Love" – 3:29
5. "Remember" – 3:19
6. "When Love Lives In Heaven" – 3:43
7. "Far Away From Home" – 4:19
8. "When Life" – 4:07
9. "Lullaby For Love" – 3:12
10. "You" – 03:34
11. "On the Radio" – 2:59
12. "21st Century Digital Girl" – 2:53
13. "I Need You (DJ Uhey Rmx)" – 5:34
14. "21st Century (DJ Satomi Remix)" – 6:07
15. "She (Skam Remix)" – 5:54
