= 21st Century (Groove Coverage album) =

Studio album by Groove Coverage
- Released: July 7, 2006
- Genre: Trance
- Labels: Zeitgeist (Universal), Suprime:Music

Groove Coverage chronology
Best Of (2005)	21st Century (2006)	Greatest Hits (2007)

Singles from 21st Century
- 1. "Holy Virgin" Released: 2005; 2. "On the Radio" Released: 2006; 3. "21st Century Digital Girl" Released: 2006

21st Century (known as 21st Century Digital Girl on some online stores) is the third album of German Eurodance group Groove Coverage, released on July 7, 2006. It was previously available a few days earlier than expected on the German version of iTunes. Compared to Groove Coverage's previous albums, 7 Years and 50 Days and Covergirl, this album is more pop-oriented with songs such as "21st Century Digital Girl", "What You C Is What You Get", and a rock song, titled "Rock".

== Track listings ==
No.	Title	Length
1.	"Summer Rain"	3:59
2.	"21st Century Digital Girl"	2:52
3.	"Never Ever Stop"	3:04
4.	"Holy Virgin"	3:49
5.	"Call Me"	3:33
6.	"What You C Is What You Get"	3:34
7.	"Angel from Above"	3:10
8.	"November Night"	3:20
9.	"When I Die"	3:31
10.	"On the Radio"	2:58
11.	"Rock"	2:33
12.	"When Love Lives in Heaven"	3:41
13.	"Moonlight Shadow" (Pure & Direct Version)	4:15
14.	"Indonesia"	3:06
15.	"Let It Be"	3:32

=== Singaporean, Malaysian, China (incl Hong Kong, Macau & Taiwan Edition) ===
Main Disc
No.	Title	Length
1.	"Summer Rain"	4:03
2.	"21st Century Digital Girl"	3:26
3.	"On the Radio"	3:32
4.	"Never Ever Stop"	3:07
5.	"Holy Virgin"	3:50
6.	"Call Me"	3:36
7.	"Angel from Above"	3:13
8.	"What You See Is What You Get"	3:37
9.	"When I Die"	3:34
10.	"Rock"	2:36
11.	"November Night"	3:23
12.	"Moonlight Shadow 2006" (Pure & Direct Version)	3:47
13.	"Let It Be"	3:35
14.	"Indonesia"	3:09
15.	"When Love Lives in Heaven"	3:44

Bonus CD – Exclusive DJ Extended
No.	Title	Length
1.	"21st Century Digital Girl" (Club Mix)	5:38
2.	"21st Century Digital Girl" (Conways Remix)	6:17
3.	"21st Century Digital Girl" (Teenagerz Remix)	5:36
4.	"On the Radio" (Age Pee Remix)	5:49
5.	"On the Radio" (Club Mix)	5:31
6.	"Moonlight Shadow 2006" (Josh Harris Remix)	7:24
7.	"Moonlight Shadow 2006" (French Club Mix)	6:39
8.	"Holy Virgin" (Extended Mix)	5:44
9.	"Holy Virgin" (Techouse Remix)	6:25
10.	"Holy Virgin" (Rob Mayth Remix)	5:46

=== Japanese Edition ===
The Japanese release by Farm Records includes these 4 additional tracks along with the original track listing.

No.	Title	Length
1.	"Summer Rain" (Delaction Remix)	3:48
2.	"21st Century Digital Girl" (Overhead Champion Remix)	4.47
3.	"On the Radio" (Overhead Champion Remix)	4:48
4.	"I Need You vs. I Need You" (DJ U☆Hey? Remix)	4:27

== Chart positions ==
Chart (2006)	Peak position
Austrian Albums (Ö3 Austria)	24
German Albums (Offizielle Top 100)	39
Indonesia Albums Chart	10
