= Million Tears =

Million Tears may refer to:

- Million Tears (Kasey Chambers song), 2001
- Million Tears (Groove Coverage song), 2002
