= Holy Virgin (disambiguation) =

Holy Virgin may refer to:

- The Holy Virgin, Mary
- Holy Virgin (song), single by Groove Coverage
- The Holy Virgin Mary, a 1996 painting by Chris Ofili
