= Stern über Bethlehem =

Christmas carol

- Christmas carol by Alfred Hans Zoller
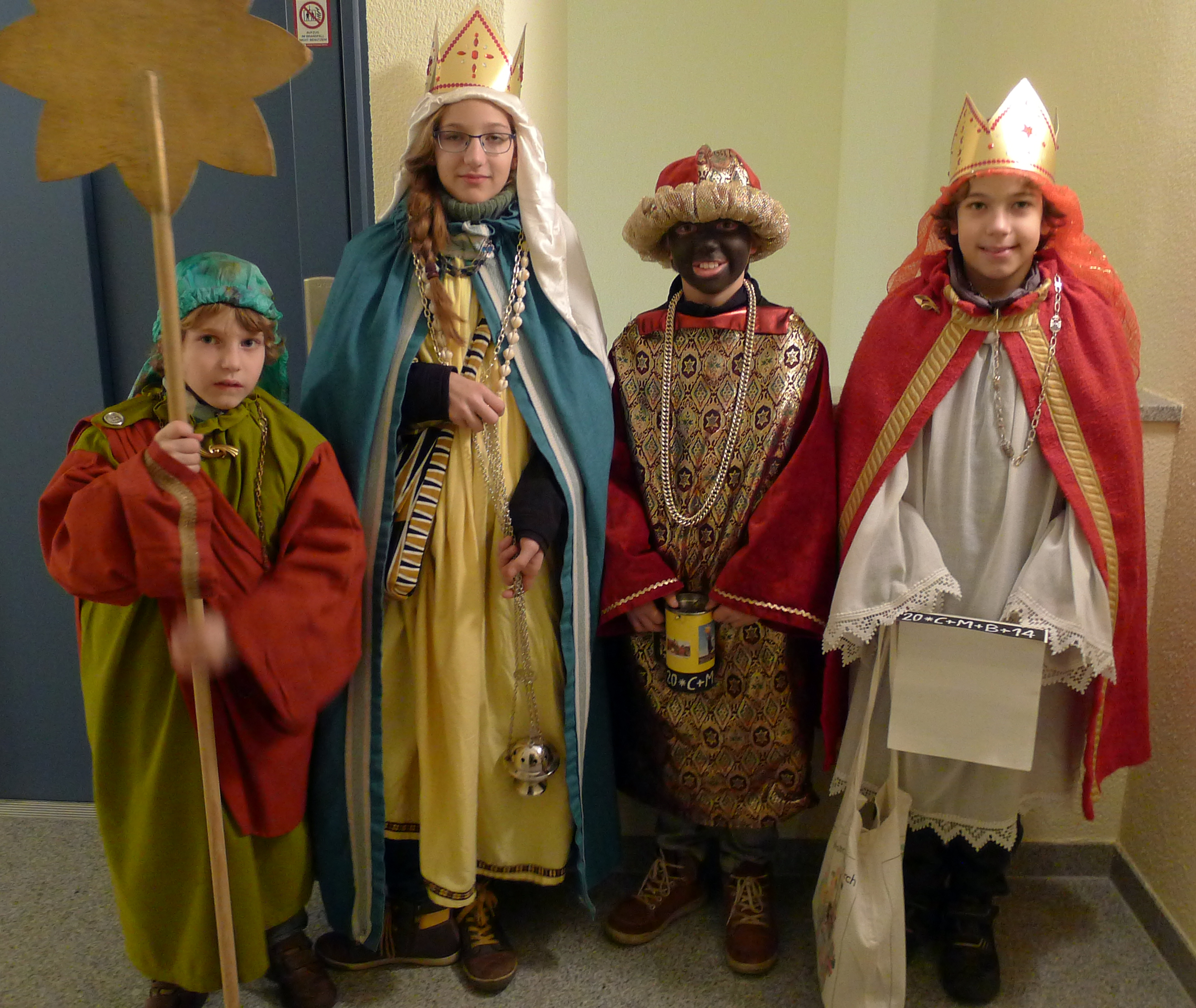
- Star singers, who frequently sing the song, in 2014
- English: Star above Bethlehem
- Language: German
- Published: 1964

"Stern über Bethlehem" (Star above Bethlehem) is a German sacred Christmas carol which Alfred Hans Zoller created in 1964 in the genre Neues Geistliches Lied. Used by star singers around Epiphany, it has become a popular song and is part of many German hymnals and songbooks.

== History ==
The carol's composer, Alfred Hans Zoller was a jazz pianist and church musician who founded a gospel choir in Reutti near Neu-Ulm, while trying to introduce gospel music in church singing. Zoller wrote the lyrics and melody of the song in 1964, in response to the third competition of the Evangelische Akademie Tutzing to promote Neues Geistliches Lied, songs for younger audiences which incorporate elements of jazz and entertaining music.

The song became popular in children's choirs and was included in regional sections of the current Protestant hymnal Evangelisches Gesangbuch (EG) and the 1975 edition of the Catholic hymnal Gotteslob. In the current Gotteslob, it is part of the common section as GL 261. Several choral books and song books have it in their Christmas section, including Cantate II by the Werkstatt Neues Geistliches Lied Bamberg. The song is frequently sung by star singers who go from house to house collecting donations for development projects.

The song title was chosen as the title of a collection of Christmas songs for guitar by Bosworth.

== Theme and text ==
The song is part of the movement Neues Geistliches Lied, a revival of church music in Germany. The text is based on the biblical story of the magi led by a star, which is enacted by singers dressed up as Kings or magi, who cross the German and Alsatian villages singing songs around Epiphany.

In this song, the circuit of the magi in the village takes on a spiritual dimension. The star is addressed, requested to show the way ("zeig uns den Weg"), and in the final stanza to also shine at home, remembering the visit in Bethlehem.

The composition of the German text, in four stanzas of four lines each, is concise, modeled on poets such as Otto Riethmüller or Rudolf Alexander Schröder. The song is made up of short words of one or two syllables, the only word of three syllables being "Bethlehem". The call "Stern über Bethlehem" begins the first and last line of every stanza, structuring the composition. The song is used frequently in nativity plays for Christmas or Epiphany worship. It can be used as a gradual for Epiphany or on the first Sunday after Epiphany, or as a song after the Gospel.

== Melody and setting ==
The melody is an example of postwar German music, stripped down to the bare essentials and focusing on musical material rather than melody. Every line is built asymmetrically in six vs. four syllables, achieving an effect of acceleration and slowing down. It adds lightness to the text, and goes well with flutes and percussion.

A harmonisation was written by Friedemann Schaber, a church musician in Rastatt in Alleluia 2005. The melody was used in 2004 for the English song "She" by Groove Coverage.

== See also ==
- List of Christmas carols
