= Herr, gib uns Mut zum Hören =

Christian hymn

- Christian hymn
- Text: by Kurt Rommel
- Language: German
- Melody: by Kurt Rommel
- Composed: 1963
- Published: 1975

"Herr, gib uns Mut zum Hören" (Lord, give us courage to listen) is a Christian hymn, with text and melody written in 1963 by Kurt Rommel. The song, of the genre Neues Geistliches Lied (NGL), is part of German hymnals, including Gotteslob, and of songbooks.

== History ==
Kurt Rommel was drafted to the Wehrmacht after his Abitur. When in France as a prisoner-of-war, he studied Protestant theology. He worked especially for young people and realised that they needed different songs than the traditional hymns. His songs, for which he also wrote the melodies, are intentionally simple, such as "Lass uns in deinem Namen, Herr".

He wrote "Herr, gib uns Mut zum Hören" in 1963. The song became part of both the Protestant and the Catholic common hymnals. In Evangelisches Gesangbuch, it is EG 667. It was included in the first Gotteslob in 1975 as GL 551. In the second edition of Gotteslob, it is GL 448, in the section "Gesänge – Leben in Gott: Gottes Wort" (Chants – Life in God: God's word). The song is also part of several songbooks, including collections for young people and ecumenical songbooks.

The song has been recommended for wedding services, and for confirmation.

== Text and music ==
The song is in four stanzas of four lines each. They are all formed following the same scheme. Each first line begins with "Herr, gib uns Mut" (Lord, give us courage) followed by for what courage is needed: courage to listen, courage to serve, courage for silence, courage to believe, and each second line expands that issue. Each third line says "Wir danken dir" (We thank you) followed in the fourth by a related reason to give thanks.
