= Alfred Hans Zoller =

- Born: 6 October 1928; Neu-Ulm
- Died: 14 October 2006 (aged 78)
- Occupations: Church musician; Jazz pianist; Composer
- Works: "Stern über Bethlehem"

Alfred Hans Zoller (6 October 1928 – 14 October 2006) was a German composer, jazz pianist, church musician and organist. He is known for the 1964 song "Stern über Bethlehem", which is often used by star singers, and appeared in 2004 as a cover version, She.

== Life ==
Born in Neu-Ulm, Zoller was organist from 1956, then in 1960 also cantor in Reutti near Neu-Ulm. There he founded the "St. Margret Singers", a gospel choir, which contributed to the fact that elements of jazz and "black music" found their way into German Protestant church services. He composed numerous songs in the genre Neues Geistliches Lied.

== Legacy ==
Zoller's song "Stern über Bethlehem" found its way into some regional parts of the Protestant hymnal Evangelisches Gesangbuch (EG), for example in Bavaria EG 545, in Hesse EG 542, in Württemberg EG 540. In the Catholic prayer and hymn book Gotteslob (GL), the song is printed as GL 261. In the Mennonitisches Gesangbuch it can be found under the number 265. In some communities it is also sung by the star singers. This makes it one of the most important Christmas hymns of modern times.

== Compositions ==
- "Lass uns spüren", 3rd prize at the 2nd competition of the Evangelische Akademie Tutzing 1963
- "Schiff in Not", together with the pastor and songwriter Kurt Rommel
- "Stern über Bethlehem", 1964, appeared as cover version under the name She at Groove Coverage 2004

== Bibliography ==
Frank Raberg: Biografisches Lexikon für Ulm und Neu-Ulm 1802–2009. Süddeutsche Verlagsgesellschaft Ulm im Jan Thorbecke Verlag, Ostfildern 2010, ISBN 978-3-7995-8040-3, (p. 489).
