= Covergirl (Groove Coverage album) =

Studio album by Groove Coverage
- Released: 2002
- Genre: Electronic
- Length: 49:17
- Label: Zeitgeist (Universal); Suprime:Music

Groove Coverage chronology
Covergirl (2002)	7 Years and 50 Days (2004)

Singles from Covergirl
- 1. "Are U Ready"; 2. "Moonlight Shadow"; 3. "God Is a Girl"

Covergirl is the first album of the German Eurodance group Groove Coverage, released in 2002. It features the two singles "Moonlight Shadow" and "God Is a Girl" in both radio edit and ballad form. The radio edit of "God Is a Girl" is a hidden track at the end of the album. The album features a few ballads and dance tracks.

Both Melanie Munch and Verena Rehm provide vocals together for most songs, with the exceptions of "Lullaby for love" which is a Verena solo, and "Moonlight Shadow" which is a Mell solo with Verena providing the piano in the piano version. "Are You Ready" and "The Beat Just Goes'" are club tracks, neither of which Mell or Verena provide vocals for.

"Million Tears", while not released as a single at the time, became a sleeper hit particularly popular in Singapore, where it became associated with the outlawed Salakau secret society. The song was eventually released as an EP in 2015.

== Track listing ==
1. "Moonlight Shadow" (2001) – 2:49
2. "Million Tears" – 3:12
3. "You" – 3:32
4. "Last Unicorn" – 3:54
5. "Only Love" – 3:28
6. "God Is a Girl" (Album Version) (2002) – 3:03
7. "Little June" – 3:37
8. "Far Away From Home" – 4:18
9. "Lullaby For Love" – 3:12
10. "Moonlight Shadow" (Piano) – 4:36
  In The Club
11. "Beat Just Goes" – 3:50
12. "Are You Ready" (2000) – 9:39
13. "God Is a Girl" (radio version) (hidden track after some seconds of silence at the end of "Are U Ready")

Note: Like "Hit Me", "Are You Ready" is usually not taken into account as a single.

== Chart positions ==
Chart (2002)	Peak position
Austrian Albums (Ö3 Austria)	43
German Albums (Offizielle Top 100)	39
Polish Albums (ZPAV)	27

== Videos ==
- "Moonlight Shadow"
- "God Is a Girl"
