= The End (Groove Coverage song) =

Single by Groove Coverage

from the album 7 Years and 50 Days
- Released: 2003
- Genre: Trance
- Label: Zeitgeist (Universal); Suprime:Music
- Songwriter(s): Gerd Jakobs, Axel Konrad, David Lubega, Daniel Peyer, Ole Wierk

Groove Coverage singles chronology
"Poison" (2003)	"The End" (2003)	"7 Years and 50 Days" (2004)

"The End" is the second single from the album 7 Years and 50 Days by German trance group Groove Coverage.

== Remix List ==
1. "The End" (Radio Edit) – 3:42
2. "The End" – 3:08
3. "The End" (Extended Mix) – 8:11
4. "The End" (Special D Remix) – 6:57
5. "The End" (Axel Konrad Remix) – 7:35
6. "The End" (Brooklyn Bounce Remix) – 6:03

== Chart positions ==
Chart (2003)	Peak position
Austria (Ö3 Austria Top 40)	16
Germany (GfK)	14
Hungary (Dance Top 40)	28
