= Baracuda (band) =

German band

- Origin: Germany
- Genres: Eurodance, trance, dance-pop, pop rock
- Years active: 2002–2008
- Members: Axel Konrad; Ole Wierk; Toby Sky; Suny
- Website: baracuda-music.com

Baracuda was a German dance project founded by Axel Konrad and Ole Wierk of Suprime Records in the Winter of 2002. Baracuda consists of Tobias Lammer, otherwise known as DJ Toby Sky and vocalist Suny.

== History ==
Their debut, most popular and well-known track is "Damn! (Remember the Time)", a cover of the Matthias Reim song "Verdammt, Ich Lieb' Dich". This track managed to secure Baracuda the 12th spot in the German Single Chart. Baracuda's second track, "I Leave The World Today", became fairly popular in the Summer of 2003.

Two years later in July 2005 Baracuda released their third single, "Ass Up". This song managed to grab the 70th spot in the German Singles Charts.

Baracuda released a fourth single "La Di Da" in May 2007.

In August 2008 the group released their fifth single, "I Will Love Again", a cover of Lara Fabian's famous hit from the year 2000. This single's success was more of that of their previous tracks, grabbing the 34th position in the German Singles Chart. The song makes use of the melody evident in Groove Coverage's track "God is a Girl".

Later that year, they released their sixth and final single, "Where is the Love", an adaptation of Nightwish's song "Amaranth". The song features lyrics sampled and modified from the chorus of Alice Cooper's song "Poison".

The group did not make plans for a full album. They parted ways with EMI Music a couple of years later and have not performed together since. According to the production company, no further singles are currently planned.

== Line-Up ==
- Axel Konrad (Groove Coverage) - producer
- Ole Wierk (Groove Coverage) - producer
- Tobias Lammer (DJ Toby Sky) - disk-jockey and live act
- Suny (vocals and live act)

== Discography ==
=== Singles ===
Year	Title	Peak chart positions				
Year	Title	AUT	CZ	FIN	GER	NOR
2002	"Damn! (Remember the Time)"	23	-	-	12	23
2003	"I Leave the World Today"	56	-	-	48	-
2005	"Ass Up!"	40	-	5	44	4
2007	"La Di Da"	67	-	-	59	-
2008	"I Will Love Again"	12	-	23	10	6
2008	"Where is the Love"	38	34	12	20	67

== See also ==
- Groove Coverage - a related group by Axel Konrad and Ole Wierk
