= Star singers =

Children and young people walking from house to house with a star on a rod

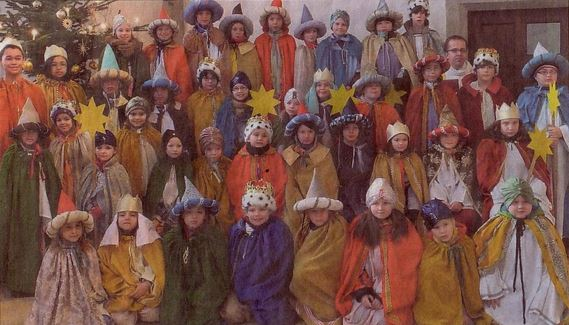
Star singers from Hochfranken.

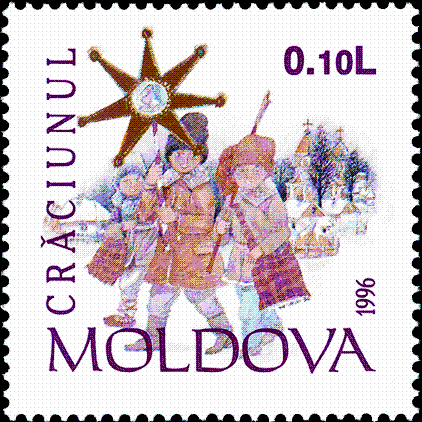
Star boys. Children singing Christmas carols.

Star singers, also known as Epiphany singers, or Star boys' singing procession (England), are children and young people walking from house to house with a star on a rod and often wearing crowns and dressed in clothes to resemble the Three Magi (variously also known as Three Kings or Three Wise Men). The singing processions have their roots in an old medieval ecclesiastical play, centred on the Biblical Magi of the Christmas story in the Gospel of Matthew (Matthew 2:1–28), appropriate to Epiphany. It is observed usually during the period between 27 December and 6 January (the feast of the Epiphany).

In Scandinavia and Central Europe a special set of songs, distinct from Christmas carols has developed in this context. In England, the liturgical drama developed from being performed by cathedral schoolboys in the 16th century to become a more secular mystery drama, also containing some ordinary Christmas songs and carols. Historically performed by boys and male adolescents only, it is nowadays performed by children and young people of both sexes in most regions where the tradition is alive.

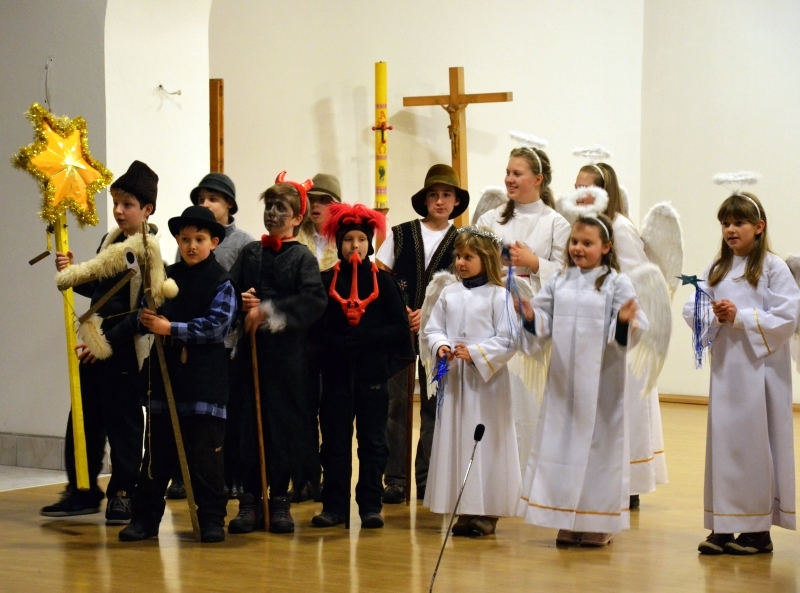
Star boys and angels singing carols in church during Christmas and Epiphany in Sanok, Poland 2013

== History ==
At a synod in Konstanz in Germany at Christmas in 1417 the British clergies performed the Star boy drama for the rest of the participants at the meeting. They wore expensive costumes and had a large shining star. The performance was a huge success at the church conference and could have been one of the main reasons for the growing popularity of the drama in post-medieval Europe.

The importance of the Twelfth Day and the feast of the Epiphany grew with the introduction of the Gregorian calendar as the day, according to the earlier Julian calendar, is also the Old Christmas Day.

After the Reformation in the 16th century, pupils of the cathedral schools in Protestant nations conducted these processions to raise funds to replace the church support that had disappeared. The custom passed further on to the general populace as a kind of narrative folk drama, but seems to have declined in its original form since the late 19th century.

Since then the singing procession has become common in many parts of Europe (both in Catholic and Protestant areas) and in Russia. In most countries it is no longer restricted to boys, but children or both sexes participate. In Germany, Austria and Belgium organisations centrally organise the processions, collecting money for charity or international aid projects, leading to widespread support of the custom.

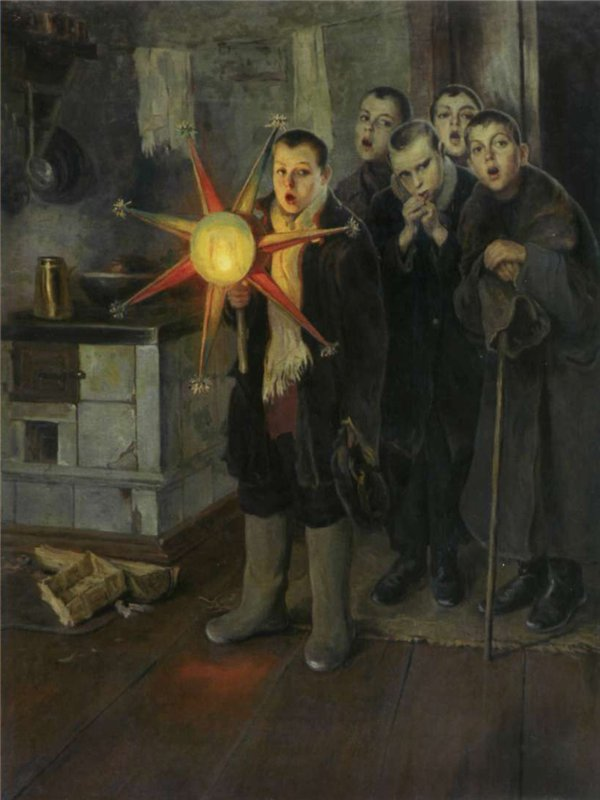
In Ukraine (1880, during the existence of Russian Empire)

== Central Europe ==
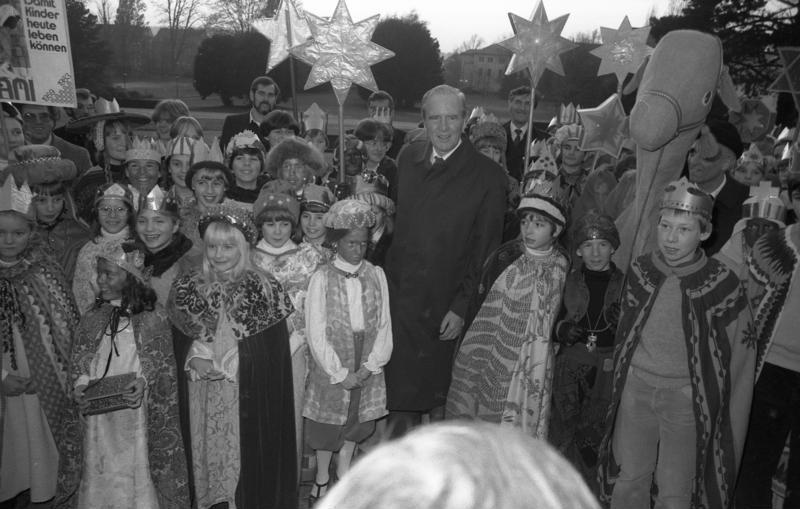
Epiphany singers are received by Germany's Federal President Karl Carstens in Bonn 1 December 1982. The poster reads: "Dreikönigssingen 1983 AMANI. Damit Kinder heute leben können".

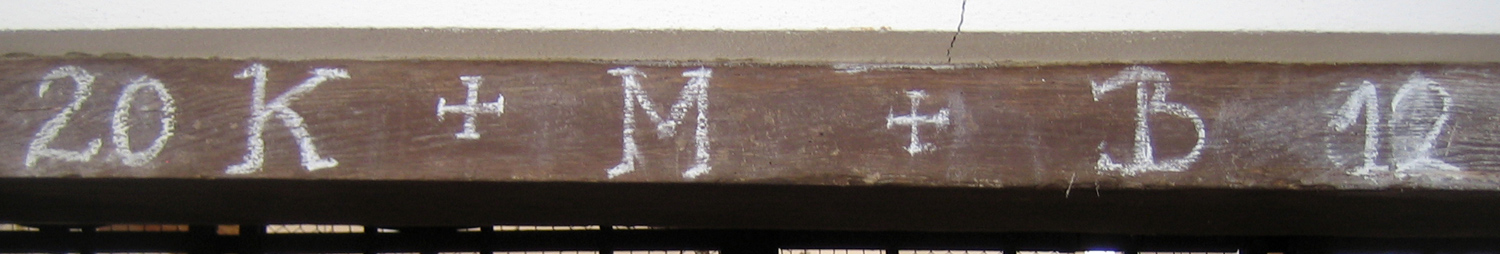
Inscription in Hamry na Šumavě, in the Czech Republic

In Germany, the Czech Republic, and Austria, Epiphany singing is performed at or close to Epiphany (6 January) and has developed into a nationwide custom, where the children of both sexes call on every door and are given sweets and money for charity projects - mostly in aid of poorer children in other countries.

A tradition in much of Central Europe involves writing a blessing above the main door of the home, which incorporates the letters C, M, and B and the current year: for example in the year 2014 it would have been "20 ✝ C ✝ M ✝ B ✝ 14". The initials refer to the Latin phrase Christus mansionem benedicat ("May Christ bless this house"); folkloristically the letters are often interpreted as the names of the Three Wise Men (Caspar, Melchior, Balthasar). In Catholic parts of Germany and in Austria, this is done by the Sternsinger (literally "Star singers"). After having sung their songs, recited a poem, and collected donations for children in poorer parts of the world, they will chalk the blessing on the top of the door frame or place a sticker with the blessing.

=== In Austria ===
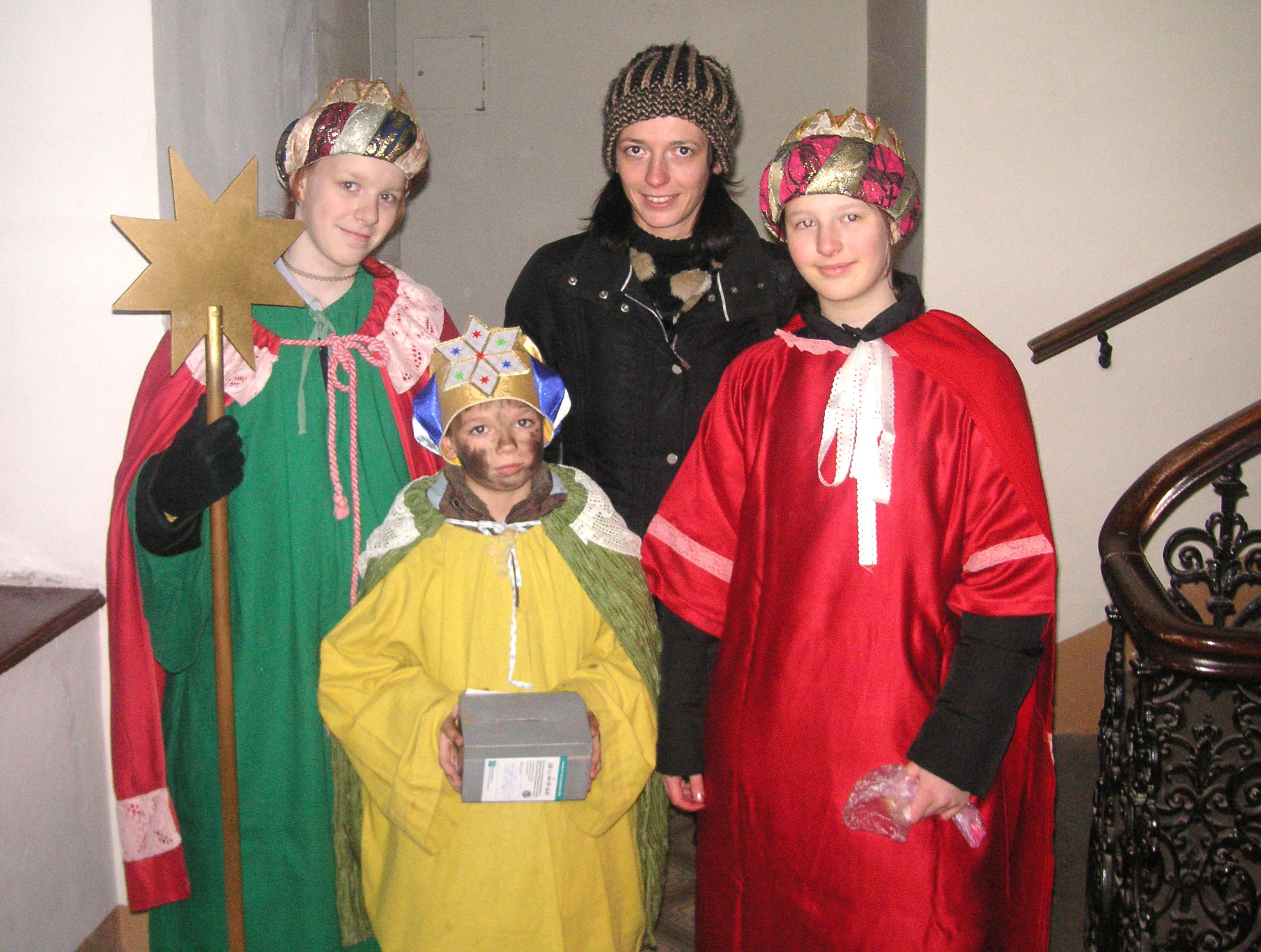
Star singers in Vienna, Austria.

In Austria the biggest carol singing campaign is organized by the "DKA" (Dreikönigsaktion), an aid foundation founded by the youth organization Katholische Jungschar. Annually about 85,000 children and 30,000 adults take part in the "Dreikönigsaktion".

=== Among Croats ===
Among Croats, star singers are known as Betlemaši ('Betlehemians') or Zvjezdari ('Stargazers' or 'Starbearers'). They traditionally perform a mystery play about the meeting of the Three Kings with Herod, who is being questioned about the newborn Messiah, door to door. They are usually consisted of three young men dressed as kings and one young man carrying a star (representing a Star of Bethlehem). After the play, they are usually given gifts (usually candies) This congratulatory procession (ophod) through the village is known as zvjezdarenje or ophod sveta tri kralja ('Three Kings' Procession'). During the ophod, boys sing traditional songs, mostly themed with the Epiphany. They are known as Betlemari in Podravina and among Bunjevci. Similar plays are also performed among Burgenland Croats and Croats of Hungary (Somodor, Lakócsa, Balaton area, Berzence etc.) In Csávoly (Čavolj), during the afternoon, three young men dressed in white, with a belt tied around their shoulders, a saber at their side, and a hat similar to a bishop's mitre, would visit village homes and congratulate them Epiphany, holding a bright six-pointed star in their hand.

=== In Germany ===
Annually around 300 000 people are active in collecting donations in Germany.

=== In Slovakia ===
The biggest carol singing campaign in Slovakia is Dobrá Novina (English: "Good News"). It is also one of the biggest charity campaigns by young people in the country. Dobrá Novina is organized by the youth organization eRko.

== England and Scotland ==
The Star singers, aged about ten to fifteen, are dressed in long white shirts and pointed brown or white paper hats, in imitation of a well-known picture of the Biblical Magi as Babylonians Balthazar carries the star and Caspar and Melchior are armed with wooden swords. The other characters usually do not disguise themselves but also dress in long shirts, often in brown, green or grey colours and conical hats. Joseph has got a cylindrical paper hat and a wooden timber or broad axe. King Herod wears a crown and he and his soldiers carry wooden swords. In the crowd there may also be shepherds with long shirts and sticks and some angels with white shirts and wings.

The Star singers walk about from house to house "singing at the doors, with a star on a pole". The dramatic part is introduced by one of the Wise Men knocking on someone's door asking: "May the star come in?" If the offer is accepted, they are all invited inside. Then the whole procession will enter the home singing a special Christmas carol. Then the play begins.

In the performance, the Three Wise Men, Gaspar, Melchior and Balthazar, are first confronted by Joseph, who tries to protect the newborn baby Jesus (a doll) and his wife Mary from the intruders with a wooden axe. The three magi are however most welcome inside after saying that they have brought with them presents for the child. The Wise Men also have to mislead King Herod, who is also trying to find the new born 'prince' in the stable. Both Gaspar and Melchior fight the king and his men with swords, together with Joseph who uses his broad axe, while Mary nurses her son and Balthazar takes care of the shining star.

After the performance Judas comes to collect money or other gifts from the audience in a large bag. The boys and girls are usually treated to drinks and cakes afterwards. Then the Star singers leave the house for their next visit to somewhere in the neighbourhood, singing a song containing a farewell and many thanks for the received gifts.

The star itself is made anew each year, using transparent paper on a constructed frame built of wooden lists and with one to three candles placed inside. The star on the rod has to be movable and turned around all the time, so that the paper does not get overheated and does not go up in flame.

The Star boys' singing procession in England seems later to have been mixed together with several other kinds of carol singers at Christmas. They do not go from house to house, but visit two or three local pubs to receive free beer. Nowadays they are not carrying the shining star anymore, but just a quadrangular paraffin wax on a long stick or even a candle lamp with an ordinary handle. Whereas religious folk plays are the norm in the rest of Europe, the British folk drama is absolutely secular, even if they are mostly taking place on the Christian festival days.

== "Stjernespill" in Scandinavia and Finland ==
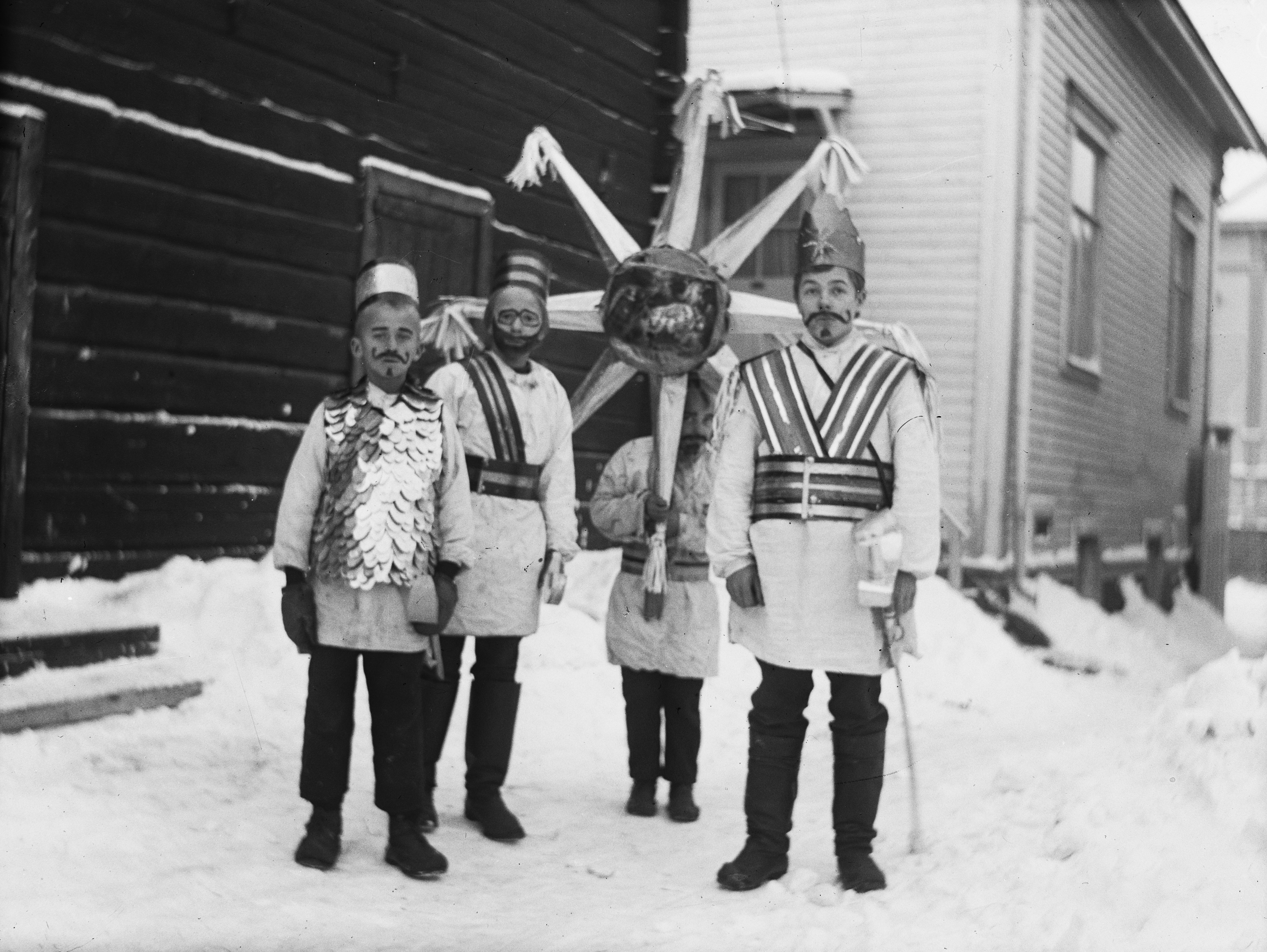
Finnish Star boys (tiernapojat) in Oulu, 1919.

In the Nordic countries the Star boys' singing procession is known all along the coast, though not often in inland communities. At the end of the 1880s many objected to this Catholic form of organised begging, and officials began forbidding the practice. By the 1900s it had largely disappeared, and there are now just a few places where the original play of the Star boys can be counted as an unbroken linear tradition, for instance the islands of Amager in Denmark, and Haram and Vigra on the west coast of Norway, but the most famous one is probably the Star boys' singing procession in the small town of Grimstad on the south coast of Norway.

=== Sweden ===
In the 19th century the Swedish Star boys started to join in with horse riding on St. Stephen's Day, 26 December. The tradition of Star boys (sometimes even with Judas Iscariot), singing and acting about Christmas, Saint Stephen and Epiphany, has traditionally been performed from St. Stephen's Day until Epiphany.

Today they are only to be seen bringing up the rear together with bridesmaids and elves as a part of the Lucia procession on 13 December. Recently school teachers, nursery nurses and Christian clergymen have tried to revitalize the play for small children, inviting their parents to come to the schools, the kindergartens or the churches to see it performed. But the popular and more humorous folkloristic elements of the play are often left out.

=== Finland ===
In Finland, a version of the Star boys' procession originating in the city of Oulu, a musical play known as Tiernapojat, has become established as a cherished Christmas tradition nationwide. The Tiernapojat show is a staple of Christmas festivities in schools, kindergartens, and elsewhere, and it is broadcast every Christmas on radio and television. The Finnish version contains non-biblical elements such as king Herod vanquishing the "king of the Moors", and a short song of praise to Tsar Alexander. Nowadays, the Tiernapojat tradition is slowly fading in Finland, but in Oulu the tradition still remains strong.

== Star singer songs ==
- Die heil′gen drei König′ mit ihrigem Stern, text and melody from Bavaria (18th century).
- Die Legende von den drei weisen Königen, text: Rolf Krenzer, melody: Ludger Stühlmeyer (ZDF-Star singer event 1999).
- Die Weisen aus dem Morgenland, text and melodie: Kurt Rommel.
- Drei Könige führte Gottes Hand, text: Friedrich Spee, melody: Cologn, 1880.
- Erfüll mit deinen Gnaden Herr Jesus dieses Haus (Ein Kind ist uns geboren), Leipzig 1884.
- Es ist für uns eine Zeit angekommen, text and melody from Swissland (19th century).
- Es ziehn aus weiter Ferne drei Könige einher, text and melody from Austria.
- Gott griaß enk Laidln ollesombt, megn sai so fü enk woin, from Bavaria.
- Heller Stern in der dunklen Nacht, text: Diethard Zils, melody: France 1874 ([[Il est né le divin enfant|Il est né le divin enfant]]).
- Hier kommen die Könige, sie folgen einem Stern, text: Rolf Krenzer, melody Peter Janssens.
- Nun sehet den Stern, den wir bringen, text: Georg Thurmair, melody: Adolf Lohmann.
- Seht den Stern, den wir euch bringen, text: Peter Gerloff, melody: Ludger Stühlmeyer, 2016.
- Seht ihr unsern Stern dort stehen, text: Zils, melody: France 18. Jahrhundert (Les Anges dans nos campagnes).
- Stern über Bethlehem, zeig uns den Weg, text and melody: Alfred Hans Zoller, 1964.
- Wir heil'gen drei Könige mit unserm Stern, Folk song.
- Wir kommen daher aus dem Morgenland, text: Maria Ferschl, melody: Heinrich Rohr.
- Wir sind die drei Könige, text and music: Kurt Mikula.

== See also ==
- Cavalcade of Magi
- Chalking the door
- King Cake
- kolęda, koliada and koliadka (in Slavic countries)
- Liturgical drama
- Medieval theatre
- Mystery play
- Rosca de reyes
- cs:Tříkrálová sbírka (Czech Republic)
