= You (Special D. song) =

Single by Special D.

from the album Reckless
- Released: 2004
- Length: 2:58 (Single Edit)
- Label: Digidance
- Songwriter(s): Special D.
- Producer(s): Special D.

Special D. singles chronology
"Nothing I Won't Do" (2004)	"You" (2004)	"Here I Am" (2005)

"You" is the fourth single by German DJ Special D., which was released in 2004. The song peaked at number 18 on the Dutch singles chart.

== Track listing ==
CD single
No.	Title	Length
1.	"You" (Single Edit)	2:58
2.	"You" (Rob Mayth Remix Edit)	3:27
3.	"You" (Club Mix)	7:02
4.	"You" (DJ Bonebreaker Remix)	6:08
5.	"You" (Rob Mayth Remix)	6:32
6.	"Speakerslayer v2.0"	6:35
7.	"TMF Awards Belgium Megamix"	4:07

== Charts ==
Chart (2004–05)	Peak position
Netherlands (Single Top 100)	18
Belgium (Ultratop 50 Flanders)	36

== Release history ==
Date	Format	Label
2004	CD single	Digidance
21 September 2004	Vinyl	Mental Madness
8 November 2004	Vinyl	Mental Madness
