= Runaway (Groove Coverage song) =

Single by Groove Coverage

from the album 7 Years and 50 Days
- Released: 2004
- Genre: Trance
- Label: Zeitgeist (Universal); Suprime:Music
- Songwriter(s): Lou Bega, Axel Konrad, Ole Wierk, Verena Rehm
- Producer(s): Dennis Horstmann

Groove Coverage singles chronology
"7 Years and 50 Days" (2004)	"Runaway" (2004)	"She" (2004)

"Runaway" is the fourth single from the album 7 Years and 50 Days by German trance group Groove Coverage.

== Remix list ==
1. "Runaway" (Josh Harris Vocal Club Edit) – 3:48
2. "Runaway" (Josh Harris Vocal Club Mix) – 7:22
3. "Runaway" (Josh Harris Dub) – 6:57
4. "Runaway" (Special D Remix) – 6:28
5. "Runaway" (Flip & Fill Remix) – 5:23
6. "Runaway" (Friday Night Posse Remix) – 7:19
7. "Runaway" (DJ Manian Remix) – 6:36
8. "Runaway" (Axel Konrad Remix) – 7:10
9. "Runaway" (Extended Mix) – 5:00
10. "Runaway" (U.K. Radio Edit) – 3:08
11. "Runaway" (Alternative Radio Mix) – 2:55
12. "Runaway" (Acappella) – 3:20

== Charts ==
Chart (2004–2005)	Peak position
Austria (Ö3 Austria Top 40)	10
Germany (GfK)	20
Hungary (Dance Top 40)	9
