= Kurt Rommel =

German theologian (1926–2011)

- Born: 20 December 1926; Kirchheim unter Teck, Weimar Republic
- Died: 5 March 2011 (aged 84); Stuttgart, Baden-Württemberg, Germany
- Occupations: Theologian; Pastor; Author; Editor; Hymnwriter; Composer
- Organizations: Evangelische Landeskirche in Württemberg; Evangelisches Gemeindeblatt für Württemberg

Kurt Rommel (20 December 1926 – 5 March 2011) was a German Protestant pastor of the Evangelische Landeskirche in Württemberg, author of spiritual books, and hymnodist. He wrote text and tune of hymns contained in both Protestant and Catholic hymnals.

== Career ==
Born in Kirchheim unter Teck, Rommel was drafted to the Wehrmacht after his Abitur. He became a prisoner-of-war in France, where he was able to study Protestant theology. He worked as a parish pastor in Friedrichshafen and then at the St. Paulus church in Schwenningen from 1966. Rommel was also youth pastor (Jugendpfarrer) in Stuttgart. He wrote texts and tunes of many hymns of the genre Neues Geistliches Lied, realising that young people needed different songs than the traditional hymns. In 1962, he founded the form Kinogottesdienst of services held in a cinema, with a band instead of an organ.

From 1974, he was editor, and later chief editor, of the Evangelisches Gemeindeblatt für Württemberg, a regional news service of the Protestant church, until 1992. He published several books and a series of recordings. In retirement, he lived in Weil der Stadt.

Rommel died in Stuttgart-Bad Cannstatt at age 84.

== Works ==
=== Music ===
Rommel wrote around 800 songs, with often both text and tunes, and 1000 rounds. His songs are often intentionally simple. Some of them were included in the Protestant hymnal Evangelisches Gesangbuch (EG) and the Catholic hymnal Gotteslob (GL), which includes the earlier edition of Gotteslob and regional sections of both hymnals. More songs are contained in other hymnals and songbooks, including:

- "Gib uns Frieden jeden Tag", 1963, EG 425
- "Herr, gib mir Mut zum Brückenbauen", 1963
- "Singet, danket unserm Gott", 1963
- "Herr, gib uns Mut zum Hören", 1963/1964, GL 521 in the first edition, GL 448
- "Bevor die Sonne sinkt, will ich den Tag bedenken", c. 1964
- "Lass uns in deinem Namen, Herr", 1965, GL 446
- "Wir wissen nicht, was kommt", 1965
- "Lass uns hören, Herr und Gott", tune by Alfred Hans Zoller
- "Du hast uns, Herr, gerufen", 1967, EG 168
- "Wenn wir jetzt weitergehen, dann sind wir nicht allein", 1967
- "Ein Kind ist angekommen", 1968

His songs appeared in songbooks in Switzerland, the Netherlands, Finland and Norway. A collection of his songs was published in 2007, titled Fest verwurzelt (Firmly rooted). "Lass uns in deinem Namen, Herr" was included in the 2018 songbook Wo wir dich loben, wachsen neue Lieder – plus (Where we praise you, new songs grow) by Strube-Verlag, including a translation into French.

=== Publications ===
Rommel wrote more than 100 books, including:

- Mut zum Trauern, Quell-Verlag, Stuttgart, 1974, ISBN 3-7918-2106-7
- Von der Lust und Last des Alters, Quell-Verlag, Gütersloh, 2001, ISBN 3-579-03419-7
- Menschen, Kirchen, Anekdoten. Entdeckungen in unseren württembergischen Gemeinden, Quell Verlag, Stuttgart 1987, ISBN 3-7918-2317-5
- Heiteres und Ernstes aus der württembergischen Kirchengeschichte
- Manche mögen's christlich. Texte zum Weiterdenken Edition Gemeindeblatt, Stuttgart 2006, ISBN 978-3-920207-17-9
