= 7 Years and 50 Days =

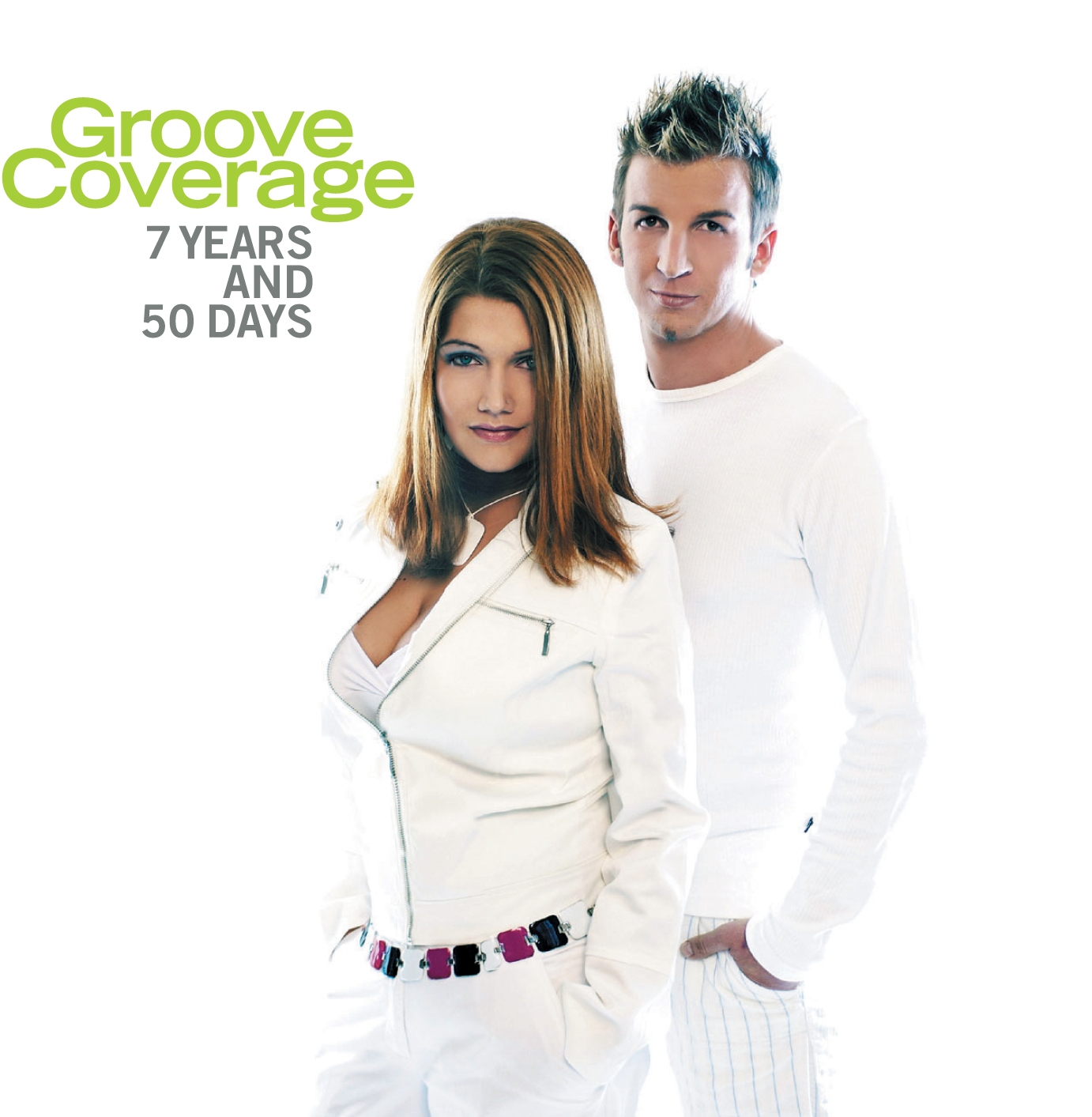

Studio album by Groove Coverage
- Released: 2004
- Genre: Trance
- Length: 55:47
- Labels: Zeitgeist (Universal); Suprime:Music
- Producers: Axel Konrad, Ole Wierk

Groove Coverage chronology
Covergirl (2002)	7 Years and 50 Days (2004)	Poison (2004)

Singles from 7 Years and 50 Days
- 1. "The End" Released: April 14, 2003; 2. "Poison" Released: November 3, 2003; 3. "7 Years and 50 Days" Released: March 29, 2004; 4. "She" Released: July 26, 2004; 5. "Runaway" Released: November 22, 2004

7 Years and 50 Days is the second album of the German Euro-trance band Groove Coverage, released in 2004. Several versions of the album were released, most significant being the 'second edition' (or the 'limited edition'), which replaced "Fragezeichen" with "She" and included a bonus track as well as a thong looking like that worn by the girl on the cover of the band's single God Is A Girl. Other versions differ from country to country.

== Track listing ==
1. "Poison" – 3:05
2. "7 Years and 50 Days (Radio Edit)" – 3:45
3. "Remember" – 3:18
4. "Runaway" – 3:05
5. "I Need You vs. I Need You" – 5:41
6. "The End" – 3:38
7. "Force of Nature" – 3:06
8. "When Life" – 4:05
9. "Home" – 3:17
10. "7 Years and 50 Days" (Album Version) – 3:18
11. "Can't Get Over You" – 3:24
12. "The End" (Special D Remix) – 3:45
13. "Not Available" – 4:40
14. "??? – Fragezeichen" – 3:50 (translation: Question Marks) (first edition track) / "She" (second edition track)
15. "God Is a Girl" (second edition bonus track) – 3:37

Note: "Fragezeichen" is the early version of "She" with no lyrics.

== Chart positions ==
Chart (2004)	Peak position
Austrian Albums (Ö3 Austria)	12
German Albums (Offizielle Top 100)	15
Hungarian Albums (MAHASZ)	13
Indonesia Albums Chart	9
Polish Albums (ZPAV)	24

== Singles ==
- "The End" (2003)
- "Poison" (2003)
- "7 Years and 50 Days" (2004)
- "Runaway" (2004)
- "She" (2004)

== Music videos ==
- "Poison"
- "The End"
- "7 Years and 50 Days"
- "Runaway"
- "She"
