= Hands up (music genre) =

Electronic dance music genre

- Other names: HandzUp!, Dancecore
- Stylistic origins: Eurodance, dance, techno
- Cultural origins: Early 2000s, Germany
- Derivative forms: Jumpstyle, nightcore

Hands up (often stylized as HandzUp!, and also known as dancecore) is an electronic dance music genre that emerged in Germany during the early 2000s. It features high tempos, catchy synthesizer melodies, and a pop song structure. The name references the "hands in the air" gesture common in club culture.

== Musical characteristics ==
Hands Up tracks typically range between 138 and 155 beats per minute. The production relies on heavy basslines placed on the off-beat, hard kicks, and supersaw synthesizer leads. Producers frequently use hardware synthesizers like the Roland JP-8080 to create the genre's short staccato melodic riffs.

Vocally, the genre features sentimental pop hooks sung by female vocalists or pitched-up male vocals. The lyrics usually focus on positive themes like partying or romance. The genre prioritizes a verse-chorus pop structure rather than the long tension-building drops found in traditional techno music. Later in the 2000s, producers incorporated elements from jumpstyle and hardstyle, such as distorted jumpkicks and heavy guitar riffs. Remixing and covering pop and rock hits from previous decades is a very common practice within the scene.

== History ==
The genre formed as producers sought to make trance music more accessible and danceable for mainstream audiences. Early pioneers like Starsplash and Mark 'Oh bridged the gap between happy hardcore and the emerging commercial trance sound. During the mid-2000s, Hands up achieved commercial success across Europe. German acts like Cascada and Groove Coverage reached international mainstream charts. Cascada's single "Everytime We Touch" and Scooter's "Nessaja" became major chart hits, while Groove Coverage reached high positions with "Moonlight Shadow." The genre developed distinct regional scenes.

By the early 2010s, mainstream interest in Hands up declined as electro house and big room house gained popularity. Specialized clubs in Germany closed, and compilation sales dropped.

== See also ==
- Eurodance
- Nightcore
