= Es ist für uns eine Zeit angekommen =

Traditional Swiss boys' Christmas carol

"Es ist für uns eine Zeit angekommen" ("Unto us a time has come") is a traditional Swiss Star singers Christmas carol from the Canton of Lucerne. Lyrically, there are some regional variations.

== Variants ==
- A secular variant of the lyrics during the Nazi time was prepared by an otherwise unknown minor Nazi-era poet Paul Hermann (1904–1970) (no relation to the better known Jewish Hungarian cellist and composer of the same name 1902–1944), which is more popular than the original Swiss versions.
- A text variant by Maria Wolters, dating from 1957, consists of 11 verses and re-establishes the religious content of the song.

== Lyrics ==
Melody

Es ist für uns eine Zeit angekommen,
es ist für uns eine große Gnad',
Denn es ist ein Kind geboren
und das der höchste König war,
Unser Heiland Jesus Christ,
der für uns, der für uns,
der für uns Mensch geworden ist.

In der Krippe muss er liegen,
und wenn's der härteste Felsen wär':
Zwischen Ochs' und Eselein
liegst du armes Jesulein.

Drei Könige kamen, ihn zu besuchen,
der Stern führt' sie nach Bethlehem.
Sie legten ihm Kron' und Szepter ab,
Großes Opfer brachten brachten sie dar.

Unto us a time has come,
it is a great grace for us.
Because a child is born
and that was the highest king,
our saviour, Jesus Christ,
has become, has become
has become man for us.

In the cradle he must lie,
and if it were the hardest rock:
Between ox and ass
you lie, poor little Jesus.

Three kings came to seek for him,
the star led them to Bethlehem.
Crown and sceptres they put down,
brought him their rich gift.

=== Secular lyrics (1939) ===
|: Es ist für uns eine Zeit angekommen
die bringt uns eine große Freud. :|
Über's schneebeglänzte Feld
wandern wir, wandern wir
Durch die weite, weiße Welt.

|: Es schlafen Bächlein und See unterm Eise,
es träumt der Wald einen tiefen Traum. :|
Durch den Schnee, der leise fällt
wandern wir, wandern wir
Durch die weite, weiße Welt.

|: Vom hohen Himmel ein leuchtendes Schweigen
erfüllt die Herzen mit Seeligkeit. :|
Unterm sternbeglänzten Zelt
wandern wir, wandern wir
Durch die weite, weiße Welt.

|: Unto us a time has come
that brings us great joy. :|
Over the snow-glistening field
we wander, we wander
through the wide, white world.

|: Brooks and lake sleep under the ice,
the forest dreams a deep dream. :|
Through the slowly falling snow
we wander, we wander
through the wide, white world.

|: A luminous silence from high heaven
fills the hearts with bliss. :|
Under the tent of glittering stars
we wander, we wander
through the wide, white world.

== See also ==
- List of Christmas carols
