= Million Tears (Groove Coverage song) =

Single by Groove Coverage

from the album Covergirl
- Released: 2002, 2015
- Genre: Eurodance, trance
- Songwriter(s): Axel Konrad; Ole Wierk; Tobias Lammer

"Million Tears" is a song from German Eurodance group Groove Coverage's 2002 debut album, Covergirl. It was released again in 2015 as a standalone EP featuring five new versions.

According to singer Melanie Münch, the song, which was written in only three days, tells about the heartache of losing your first love.

In Singapore, the song has become closely associated with the Salakau (369) secret society, with members frequently singing a notorious gang chant cued to the rhythm of the song during the instrumental break that follows the line "Whoa oh whoa ohh, a million tears for you". Gang membership is a criminal offense in Singapore, and police have previously investigated gang chants shouted during concerts. Due to this, Groove Coverage was advised not to play the song at their concerts in Singapore in 2019 and 2023.
