= On the Radio (Groove Coverage song) =

Single by Groove Coverage

from the album 21st Century
- Released: March 17, 2006
- Genre: Trance
- Label: Zeitgeist (Universal), Suprime:Music
- Songwriter(s): Axel Konrad, David Sobol, Ole Wierk, Tobias Künzel

Groove Coverage singles chronology
"Holy Virgin" (2005)	"On the Radio" (2006)	"21st Century Digital Girl" (2006)

"On the Radio" is the second single from the album 21st Century by German trance group Groove Coverage.

The song is a cover of "Mann im Mond" by the German a cappella/pop group Die Prinzen.

== Track listing ==
1. "On the Radio" (Radio Version) – 2:58
2. "On the Radio" (Club Mix) – 5:28
3. "On the Radio" (Extended Version) – 5:22
4. "On the Radio" (Age Pee Remix) – 5:47
5. "On the Radio" (Groove Agents Remix) – 6:30
6. "On the Radio" (Karaoke Version) – 3:02

== Charts ==
Chart (2006)	Peak position
Austria (Ö3 Austria Top 40)	23
Germany (GfK)	21
Hungary (Dance Top 40)	28
