= Reckless (Special D. album) =

Studio album by Special D.
- Released: 26 April 2004
- Genre: Eurodance
- Length: 63:33
- Label: Kontor

Reckless is the 2004 debut studio album by Special D., released on Kontor Records. It charted at number 15 in the Netherlands and 28 in Germany.

== Track listing ==
All tracks are written by Special D., except where noted.

Original Edition
No.	Title	Writer(s)	Vocals	Length
1.	"Nothing I Won’t Do"	Jake Williams	Terri Bjerre	03:05
2.	"Reckless"		Dennis Bohn	04:33
3.	"Come With Me"	Uwe Fahrenkrog-Petersen, Nena	Laura Nori	03:05
4.	"You"	Nathalie Tineo	Nathalie Tineo	05:48
5.	"Speaker Slayer"		Special D.	04:56
6.	"Home Alone"		Kimia Roth	03:05
7.	"Full Metal Jackass"		Kevin Weatherspoon	04:41
8.	"Dust to Dust"		Special D.	05:09
9.	"4maDJz"		Noreen Quade	05:41
10.	"Once Again"		Special D.	05:26
11.	"Like a Rider"		Dennis Bohn, Laura Nori	05:49
12.	"King of da Beatz"		Special D.	04:05
13.	"Someone to Love"		Special D.	05:03
14.	"Keep the Faith"	Axel Konrad, Verena Rehm	Verena Rehm	03:07
Total length:				63:33

Japanese Bonus Tracks
No.	Title	Original Performers	Length
15.	"One Day" (Special D. Remix)	Miraluna	06:14
16.	"The Sign" (Special D. Remix)	Sven-R.G. vs. Bass-T	03:38
Total length:			73:25

Russian Bonus Tracks
No.	Title	Original Performers	Length
15.	"One Day" (Special D. Remix)	Miraluna	06:14
16.	"1-2-3 Keep The Spirit With Me" (Special D. Remix)	Jan Wayne	06:45
17.	"Move Your Body" (Special D. Remix)	Stacccato	06:36
Total length:			83:08

Hong Kong and Indonesian Bonus Tracks
No.	Title	Remix	Length
15.	"Come With Me" (Flip & Fill Remix)	KB Project	06:14
16.	"Home Alone" (Stacccato Remix)	Stacccato	03:38
Total length:			73:25

== Charts ==
Chart performance for Reckless
Chart (2004)	Peak position
Dutch Albums (Album Top 100)	15
German Albums (Offizielle Top 100)	1
