= Verena Rehm =

German singer and pianist (born 1984)

- Born: Verena Carmen Rehm; 14 May 1984 (age 42); Neuburg, Bavaria, West Germany
- Genres: Pop, trance, Eurodance
- Occupations: Singer, songwriter, producer
- Years active: 2002–present
- Website: Groove Coverage Official Site Suprime Records

Verena Carmen Rehm (born 14 May 1984) is a German musician best known as the backing vocalist and pianist of the Eurodance dance group Groove Coverage.

== Early life ==
After attending kindergarten, Rehm discovered her passion for music. In her autobiography on the Suprime Records website, she stated that her interest began with her father's old piano, which led Verena to begin piano lessons. At 14, she joined the cover band Querbeet. She spent 4 years with them as their lead singer, also playing the keyboard.

== Career ==
=== Suprime Records and Groove Coverage ===
Rehm has sung lead on a number of songs done by the group including "Lullaby for Love and Rock", and has had solos during the bridge of songs such as "Only Love" and "Because I Love You". She appeared in two of the group's music videos, "God Is a Girl" and "The End", although in both of these songs Mell sings the lead while Rehm provides backing vocals. Rehm was the stage performer miming the lyrics to their hit songs while Mell was pregnant. Since then, she has taken on a more behind the scenes or back seat role in the group, while she continues to write songs and record backing vocals she has been absent from video and photo shoots as well as live performances. Rehm was one of the coproducers for the group's 21st Century album.

=== Other projects and appearances ===
Rehm sings lead for the song Face 2 Face by Future Trace United, which is a group formed by the most successful DJs in Germany, including Axel Konrad and Special D, both of whom Rehm has worked with separately. Working with Special D on his album Reckless, Rehm wrote and provided lead vocals for the song Keep The Faith. Rehm also works frequently with Konrad, the Suprime Records label owner. Konrad operates under many different aliases for his music including Age Pee, Renegade Masterz, and Spring Break.

For the Renegade Masterz, she provided vocals on the songs "Crystal Ship" and "Nasty Girl". For Spring Break, her vocals are on the songs "Shut Up" and "Big Bad Love".
