= Lass uns in deinem Namen, Herr =

Christian hymn

- Christian hymn
- Written: 1964
- Text: by Kurt Rommel
- Language: German
- Melody: by Kurt Rommel

"Lass uns in deinem Namen, Herr" (Let us in your name, Lord) is a Christian hymn in German, with text and music written in 1964 by Kurt Rommel. The first lines read "Lass uns in deinem Namen, Herr, die nötigen Schritte tun" (Let us take the necessary steps in your name, Lord). It appears in major modern Protestant and Catholic hymnals in German.

== History ==
The Protestant German theologian Kurt Rommel wrote both text and music of "Lass uns in deinem Namen, Herr" in 1964. Rommel used bands in church service as early as 1962, authored religious books and wrote around 800 songs.

"Lass uns in deinem Namen, Herr" became part of regional sections of the German common Catholic hymnal Gotteslob, such as in the Diocese of Limburg as GL 864. In the second edition of 2013, it is contained in the common section as GL 446. The hymn is part of regional sections of the Protestant hymnal Evangelisches Gesangbuch, such as EG 588 in Thuringia and Bavaria. It is also contained in other hymnals and songbooks.

== Text and theme ==
"Lass uns in deinem Namen, Herr" is in four stanzas of four lines each, the first two lines being the same for all stanzas. The third line begins equally in all stanzas with the prayer "Gib uns den Mut" (Give us the courage), and is then continued differently. The first stanza has a request for the courage to act today and tomorrow full of faith, the second for the courage to live the truth full of love, the third the courage to make a new start full of hope. They reflect the triad of faith, hope and love that Paul the Apostle wrote about in his letter to the Corinthians (1 Cor 13:13). The final stanza returns to faith, requesting help to flourish as human beings, living lives full of faith, love and hope.

== Musical settings ==
Herbert Beuerle composed a three-part setting in 1974, with the tune in the middle voice. Jutta Michel Becker wrote a setting for three-part choir (SAB) and piano for the collection Silberklang (Silver sound), a song book aimed at senior citizens, and published by Schott. In 2002, Andreas Nolda wrote an organ setting.
