= 7 Years and 50 Days (song) =

Single by Groove Coverage

from the album 7 Years and 50 Days
- Released: 2004
- Genre: Trance
- Label: Zeitgeist (Universal); Suprime:Music
- Songwriter(s): Ole Wierk, Axel Konrad, Lou Bega

Groove Coverage singles chronology
"The End" (2003)	"7 Years and 50 Days" (2004)	"Runaway" (2004)

"7 Years and 50 Days" is the third single and title track from the album 7 Years and 50 Days by German trance group Groove Coverage. A video was released for this song in which a girl catches her boyfriend cheating on her which results into gluttony and ends with her eating the whole furniture of her flat while she watches Melanie Münch on TV performing the song.

== Remix List ==
1. "7 Years & 50 Days" (Radio Mix) – 3:44
2. "7 Years & 50 Days" (Album Version) – 3:19
3. "7 Years & 50 Days" (Radio Edit) – 3:47
4. "7 Years & 50 Days" (Extended Version) – 6:11
5. "7 Years & 50 Days" (Plazmatek VS. Cascada Remix) – 5:57
6. "7 Years & 50 Days" (Plazmatek VS. Cascada Remix Short Cut) – 3:37
7. "7 Years & 50 Days" (Delaction Remix) - 5:40

== Chart positions ==
Chart (2004)	Peak position
Austria (Ö3 Austria Top 40)	6
Czech Republic (IFPI)	20
Germany (GfK)	16
Hungary (Dance Top 40)	1
