= Groove Coverage =

German dance band

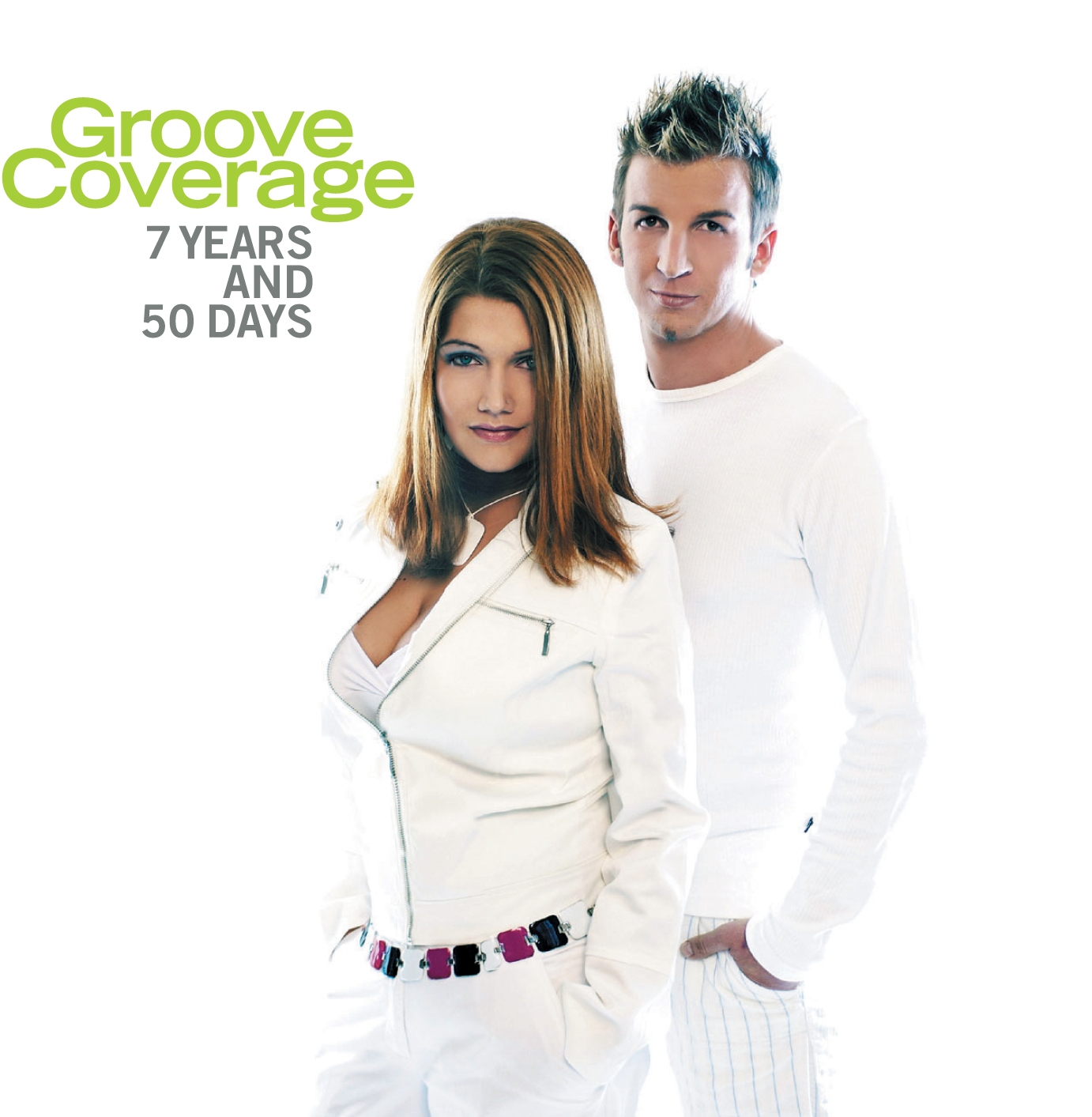
- Mell & DJ Novus

Background information
- Origin: Germany
- Genres: Eurodance, trance, hands up, dance-pop
- Years active: 1999–present
- Labels: Zeitgeist (Universal), Sony Music, Columbia, Suprime Music, Nagaswara (Indonesia)
- Members: Ole Wierk; Axel Konrad; DJ Novus; Mell; Verena Rehm
- Website: Official website

Groove Coverage is a German dance music group which consists of Axel Konrad, DJ Novus, Melanie Münch, better known as Mell (lead singer), and Verena Rehm (former stage performer, backing singer, occasional lead singer). Producers of the band are Ole Wierk and Axel Konrad. The project was founded in the summer of 2001 by DJ Novus, in co-operation with Suprime Music (Konrad). With eleven singles in the German Top 50 and over 13 million records sold worldwide, Groove Coverage is one of the most successful German dance artists.

== History ==
=== Covergirl (2001–2002) ===
Groove Coverage released a few dance singles, most notably "Are U Ready" and "Hit Me" before going on to release the breakthrough single "Moonlight Shadow" (a cover of the Mike Oldfield song) peaking at #3 in the German media control charts in June 2002. At the end of 2002, the band released their debut album Covergirl, with the follow-up single "God Is a Girl". Mell was pregnant during the production of the Moonlight Shadow music clip, which was filmed in Budapest, and was replaced by model Henrika Spillner. "Million Tears", while not released as a single, became a sleeper hit particularly popular in Singapore, where it became associated with the outlawed Salakau secret society.

=== 7 Years and 50 Days and international breakthrough (2003–2004) ===
After the success of the singles "Moonlight Shadow" and "God Is a Girl", Groove Coverage went on to release a new single titled "The End", which was released in April 2003, peaking at #14 in the German Media Control Charts. In late 2003 came the next top 10 hit single, a cover of Alice Cooper's hit "Poison", followed by the second studio album 7 Years and 50 Days in March 2004, which spawned five top 20 singles in Germany: "The End", "Poison", "7 Years and 50 Days", "She" and "Runaway".

=== 21st Century and Greatest Hits (2005–2007) ===
In 2005, 7 Years and 50 Days reached platinum sales in Asia, as well as being hugely successful in Indonesia. In the UK and Ireland, the band's cover of "Poison" became a top 40 hit, peaking at #32 in the Official UK Singles Chart which helped the band reach new territories such as Spain and China, where "God Is a Girl" became the most successful song of 2007, having been downloaded more than 1.5 million times.

In July 2006, the band released their third studio album 21st Century, which included their recent singles "Holy Virgin", "On the Radio" and "21st Century Digital Girl".

With only moderate success with their third album, Groove Coverage did not release any more music until late 2007, when they released the single "Because I Love You" to promote their first Greatest Hits compilation. Again the band only experienced moderate success with the new single and album, and were dropped by their label Universal Music Germany.

=== Riot on the Dancefloor (2010–2012) ===
In 2010, Groove Coverage celebrated their new music contract with Sony Music / Columbia. For this, they released the highly anticipated new single "Innocent", another Mike Oldfield cover. The single became the highest new entry in the German Media Control Charts, peaking at #38.

In Spring 2011, the single "Angeline" was released, peaking at #22 in the German Media Control Charts; the single proved to be a massive success for the band, staying in the German top 50 Charts for over 16 weeks, as well as peaking at #1 in both the DJ Top 100 International charts, and the MusicLoad digital charts.

In March 2012, the highly anticipated fourth studio album Riot On The Dancefloor was released.

=== "Tell Me", "Wait", and "Million Tears" (2013–2016) ===
On 1 December 2013, the band launched their new website, where they announced that they had finished work on the new single and that it would be out soon. "Tell Me" was released on 31 January 2014. The music video premiered a few days before its release and features many guest appearances including Rameez, DJane HouseKat, Verena Rehm, Micaela Schäfer and Shaun Baker.

On 19 December 2014, Groove Coverage surprised fans with the release of their single "Wait". A music video for the release was published on 17 December 2014.

On 29 May 2015, the band released their eighteenth single, "Million Tears". The track was originally featured on their 2002 album Covergirl, but it was never released as a single for it. The single version has been re-recorded with a new production.

=== "Wake Up" (2017) ===
On 1 June the group changed their Facebook picture with the message "Our next single is ready, and now we're looking for fresh re-mixers." Seeking re-mixers or producers caring to try their own version of the track 110 to 130 bpm in any kind of genre. No title or release date was given yet. Fans expected release fall of 2017.

The group wrote on their official Facebook-page that the new single would be out in autumn, and they premiered their video for "Wake Up" on their Facebook-page 11/16/17.

"Wake Up" includes a vocal loop, inspired/resembling a similar melody and lyrics of Spice Girls 1998 song "Viva Forever". Covers are a common theme often found in their production, in respect to the band's name Groove Coverage. Some of their songs, not all, are exact or partial covers re-created in the electronic dance style. The instrumental of "Wake Up" is reminiscent of their own classic aesthetics. The song runs at 128 BPM, layered in synths, melancholic melodies, and topped with 4 on the floor drumbeats. Production of this track is similar to "God Is A Girl" (a song Groove Coverage released 15 years prior) "Moonlight Shadow" and "The End" as well as the majority of their discography.

=== 20th anniversary (2021–2022) ===
In anticipation for the 20th anniversary, Groove Coverage released two new singles in November 2021: “Higher Energy” and a re-release of “Moonlight Shadow” in collaboration with W&W.

On 31 January 2022, the band posted new press pics for their 20th anniversary. A third single “Monsters In My Head” was released on 11 February 2022. Mell shared a teaser clip on her Instagram account the week before its release.

On 1 April 2022, the band began their 20th anniversary world tour. A teaser for the next single “The Truth” was posted on 11 April 2022. The single was set for release on 15 April 2022.

== Discography ==
=== Albums ===
Title	Album details	Peak chart positions	
Title	Album details	GER	AUT
Covergirl	Released: 2002; Label: Zeitgeist (Universal), Suprime Music; Formats: CD, digital download	39	43
7 Years and 50 Days	Released: 2004; Label: Zeitgeist (Universal), Suprime Music; Formats: CD, digital download	15	12
21st Century	Released: 7 July 2006; Label: Zeitgeist (Universal), Suprime Music; Formats: CD, digital download	39	24
Riot on the Dancefloor	Released: 30 March 2012; Label: Suprime Music, Sony Music Entertainment; Formats: CD, digital download	—	—
"—" denotes releases that did not chart.

=== Compilations ===
- Best of Groove Coverage (CD + DVD) (2005)
- Best of Groove Coverage: The Ultimate Collection (3 CD) (2005) (Hong Kong)
- Greatest Hits (2006) (U.S.)
- Greatest Hits (2 CD) (2007)
- Poison (The Best of Groove Coverage) (Rare Japan CD)
- The Definitive Greatest Hits & Videos (Singapore) (2008)

=== Singles ===
Year	Title	Peak chart positions									Album
Year	Title	GER	AUS	AUT	BEL (FL)	IRE	NLD	POL	SWI	UK	Album
1999	"Hit Me"	—	—	—	—	—	—	—	—	—	Single only
2000	"Are U Ready"	—	—	—	—	—	—	—	—	—	Covergirl
2002	"Moonlight Shadow"	3	39	5	50	—	68	—	52	100	Covergirl
2002	"God Is a Girl"	8	—	5	55	—	—	8	70	—	Covergirl
2003	"The End"	14	—	16	—	—	—	—	—	—	7 Years and 50 Days
2003	"Poison"	7	—	3	—	29	51	5	—	32	7 Years and 50 Days
2004	"7 Years and 50 Days"	16	—	6	—	—	—	—	—	—	7 Years and 50 Days
2004	"She"	18	—	14	—	—	—	—	—	—	7 Years and 50 Days
2004	"Runaway"	20	—	10	—	—	—	—	—	—	7 Years and 50 Days
2005	"Holy Virgin"	30	—	12	—	—	—	—	—	—	21st Century
2006	"On the Radio"	21	—	23	—	—	—	—	—	—	21st Century
2006	"21st Century Digital Girl"	41	—	32	—	—	—	—	—	—	21st Century
2007	"Because I Love You"	72	—	56	—	—	—	—	—	—	Greatest Hits
2010	"Innocent"	38	—	48	—	—	—	—	—	—	Riot on the Dancefloor
2011	"Angeline"	22	—	26	—	—	—	—	—	—	Riot on the Dancefloor
2012	"Think About the Way"	54	—	—	—	—	—	—	—	—	Riot on the Dancefloor
2012	"Riot on the Dancefloor"	91	—	72	—	—	—	—	—	—	Riot on the Dancefloor
2014	"Tell Me"	—	—	—	—	—	—	—	—	—	Singles only
2014	"Wait"	—	—	—	—	—	—	—	—	—	Singles only
2015	"Million Tears 2015"	—	—	—	—	—	—	—	—	—	Singles only
2017	"Wake Up"	—	—	—	—	—	—	—	—	—	Singles only
"—" denotes releases that did not chart.

=== Remixes ===
- Chupa - "Arriba" (2001)
- DJ Valium - "Bring the Beat Back" (2002)
- X-Perience - "It's a Sin" (2002)
- Special D. - "Come with Me" (2002)
- Silicon Bros - "Million Miles from Home" (2002)
- Seven - "Spaceman Came Traveling" (2003)
- DJ Cosmo - "Lovesong" (2003)
- Sylver - "Livin' My Life" (2003)
- Mandaryna - "Here I Go Again" (2004)
- Sylver - "Love Is an Angel" (2004)
- Alice Cooper - "Poison" (2005)
- Baracuda - "Ass Up!" (2005)
- Melanie Flash - "Halfway to Heaven" (2006)
- N-Euro - "Lover on the Line" (2006)
- Max Deejay vs. DJ Miko - "What's Up" (2006)
- Baracuda - "La Di Da" (2007)
- DJ Goldfinger - "Love Journey Deluxe" (2008)
- Arnie B - "Another Story" (2008)
- Arsenium - "Rumadai" (2008)
- Master Blaster - "Everywhere" (2008)
- N.I.N.A - "No More Tears" (2008)
- Ayumi Hamasaki - "Vogue" (2011)
- Kim Wilde - "It's alright" (2011)
- Within Temptation - "Sinéad" (2011)
- DJane Housekat feat. Rameez - "My Party" (2012)

== Members ==
- Axel Konrad (producer)
- Ole Wierk (producer)
- DJ Novus – DJ (1999–present)
- Melanie Münch (Mell) – lead singer (2002–present)
- Verena Rehm – backup singer (2002–present)
