= Melanie Münch =

German singer (born 1981)

Mell
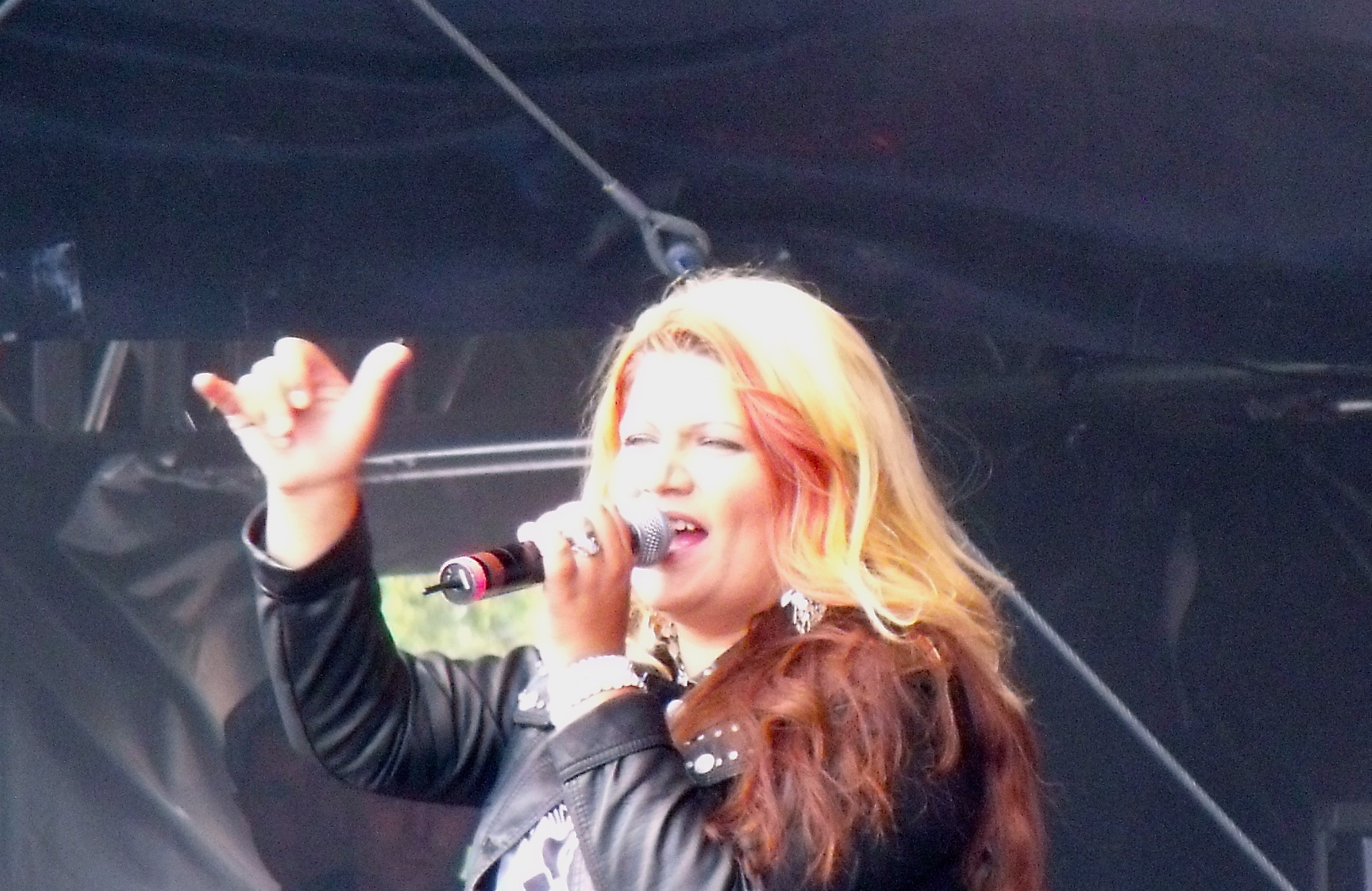
- Mell (2011)

Background information
- Born: Melanie Münch; 8 April 1981 (age 45); Munich, Germany
- Genres: Pop, dance, Eurodance
- Occupation: Singer
- Years active: 2002–present

Melanie Münch (born 8 April 1981), better known by the stage name Mell, is a German singer, best known for being the lead singer of dance group Groove Coverage.

== Life ==
Mell was born in Munich, Germany on 8 April 1981. She later moved to Ingolstadt.

=== Singing ===
According to her autobiography, Mell first developed a passion for singing when she was in elementary school. She enjoyed singing her favorite songs far more than doing her math homework, much to the dismay of her family and friends. After two years of classical Vocal-Coaching, she met the Groove Coverage Producers Axel Konrad, Ole Wierk, and her (according to present knowledge) husband Taly at a Karaoke-Bar in Ingolstadt (Bavaria), and was invited to sing and produce "Moonlight Shadow". She is perhaps most famous for her vocals on the Groove Coverage cover of "Moonlight Shadow".

=== Pregnancy ===
While she was pregnant with her second child until summer 2003 was replaced by Verena Rehm in music videos, singles, and album covers.
