= She (Groove Coverage song) =

Single by Groove Coverage

from the album 7 Years and 50 Days
- Released: July 26, 2004
- Genre: Dance-pop, reggae
- Label: Zeitgeist (Universal); Suprime:Music
- Songwriter(s): Axel Konrad, David Lubega, Ole Wierk and Alfred Hans Zoller as Stern über Bethlehem (Christmas song)

Groove Coverage singles chronology
"Runaway" (2004)	"She" (2004)	"Holy Virgin" (2005)

"She" is the fifth and final single from the album 7 Years and 50 Days by German trance group Groove Coverage. The song is a contrafactum of the German Christmas carol Stern über Bethlehem (English Star above Bethlehem).

== Remix list ==
1. "She" (Radio Edit) – 3:50
2. "She" (Extended Version) – 5:31
3. "She" (Droggn-Abroggn Remix) – 3:18
4. "She" – 2:23
5. "She" (Skam Remix) – 5:55
6. "She" (Canadian Remix) – 3:30

== Chart positions ==
Chart (2004)	Peak position
Austria (Ö3 Austria Top 40)	14
Germany (GfK)	18
Hungary (Dance Top 40)	37
