= Holy Virgin (song) =

Single by Groove Coverage

from the album 21st Century
- Released: 2005
- Genre: Trance
- Label: Zeitgeist (Universal); Suprime:Music

Groove Coverage singles chronology
| "She" (2004) | "Holy Virgin" (2005) | "On The Radio" (2006) |

"Holy Virgin" is the first single from the album 21st Century by German trance music group Groove Coverage. It is based on the song "Fata Morgana" by EAV.

== Track listing ==
1. "Holy Virgin" (radio edit) – 3:50
2. "Holy Virgin" (pop edit) – 3:28
3. "Holy Virgin" (extended mix) – 5:44
4. "Holy Virgin" (club mix) – 5:36
5. "Holy Virgin" (Rob Mayth remix) – 5:47
6. "Holy Virgin" (Tekhouse mix) – 6:23
7. "Holy Virgin" (Vinylshakers mix) – 5:25

== Chart positions ==
| Chart (2005) | Peak position |
|---|---|
| Austria (Ö3 Austria Top 40) | 12 |
| Germany (GfK) | 30 |
| Hungary (Dance Top 40) | 27 |
