= God Is a Girl =

2002 single by Groove Coverage

Single by Groove Coverage

from the album Covergirl
- Released: November 11, 2002
- Genre: Trance
- Label: Polydor Zeitgeist (Universal); Suprime:Music
- Songwriters: Ole Wierk; Axel Konrad; Lou Bega; Per Gessle

Groove Coverage singles chronology
"Moonlight Shadow" (2002)	"God Is a Girl" (2002)	"Poison" (2005)

"God Is a Girl" is the third and final single from German trance group Groove Coverage's debut album, Covergirl.

== Plagiarism ==
The chorus of the song literally quotes a melody part (namely, the vocal break) from "Jefferson", a Roxette song from their Room Service album (2001). The writer of "Jefferson", Per Gessle, made an arrangement with Groove Coverage to receive a rumoured 50% of royalties from the song, though Gessle said that figure was "far from the truth." Gessle is listed as one of the song's official songwriters/composers on BMI's website.

== Music video ==
The music video depicts a faith healing ritual conducted in a church. It features Verena Rehm as the lead singer of the church, and DJ Novus as the faith healer. During the ritual, the girl at the front of the altar is presented as the god. DJ Novus conducts faith healing to the audiences, while at the same time asking them for donations, an obvious reference to Peter Popoff.

== Cover versions ==
Taiwanese singer Ady An covered the song under the name "Tian Xiang" in Chinese. The Chinese lyrics was written by Da Zhang Wei.

Singaporean artist Jocie Guo Mei Mei covered the song under the name "Ai Qing Nü Shen (Love Goddess)" on her 2nd album, "My Darling." A music video accompanies it.

Vietnamese artist Thanh Thảo covered the song under the name "Thiên Thần Bóng Đêm" in 2004.

Electronic duo W&W remade the song in collaboration with Groove Coverage in 2018.

== Track listing ==
1. "God Is a Girl" (Radio Edit) – 3:37
2. "God Is a Girl" (Album Version) – 3:04
3. "God Is a Girl" (Extended Version) – 7:10
4. "God Is a Girl" (Axel Konrad Remix) – 6:41
5. "God Is a Girl" (Rocco Remix) – 6:54

== Charts ==
"God Is a Girl" was very successful in Germany and Austria. "God Is a Girl" was the most downloaded song in China for 2006, and there were 1.5 million legal downloads.

=== Weekly charts ===
Chart (2002–03)	Peak position
Austria (Ö3 Austria Top 40)	5
Belgium (Ultratip Bubbling Under Flanders)	5
Europe Singles Chart	37
Germany (GfK)	8
Poland (Polish Airplay Charts)	8
Switzerland (Schweizer Hitparade)	70

=== Year-end charts ===
Chart (2003)	Position
Austria (Ö3 Austria Top 40)	40
