= Moonlight Shadow =

1983 song by Mike Oldfield

- Artwork for original single

Single by Mike Oldfield

from the album Crises
- B-side: "Rite of Man"; "To France"; "Jungle Gardenia"; "Taurus 3"; "In the Pool"; "Bones"
- Released: 6 May 1983
- Recorded: February – April 1983
- Studio: Denham, England
- Genre: Pop rock; Europop
- Length: 3:37 (album version); 5:17 (12-inch version)
- Label: Virgin
- Songwriter: Mike Oldfield
- Producers: Mike Oldfield; Simon Phillips

Mike Oldfield singles chronology
"Mistake" (1982)	"Moonlight Shadow" (1983)	"Shadow on the Wall" (1983)
"The Bell" (1993)	"Moonlight Shadow" (1993)	"In Dulci Jubilo" (1993)

Music video
- "Mike Oldfield ft. Maggie Reilly - Moonlight Shadow (Official Video)" on YouTube

"Moonlight Shadow" is a song written and performed by English multi-instrumentalist Mike Oldfield, released as a single in May 1983 by Virgin Records, and included on his eighth album, Crises, of the same year. The vocals were performed by Scottish vocalist Maggie Reilly, who had collaborated with Mike Oldfield since 1980. It is Oldfield's most successful single, reaching number one on numerous charts around Europe. In the UK, it reached number four during a nineteen-week chart run and was subsequently listed by the Official Charts Company as the 29th best-selling single of 1983.

== Release ==
The single peaked at number four in the British charts, making it Oldfield's second-highest ranked single after "Portsmouth", which reached number three in 1976. "Moonlight Shadow" was successful throughout Europe; it reached number one in many countries, including Italy, Austria, Switzerland for four weeks and Norway for six weeks. It spent four weeks at number two in West Germany, reached number six in Australia, and peaked at number three in New Zealand and France. It was re-released as a maxi-CD single in 1993 to promote Oldfield's Elements box set, charting at number 52.

A 12-inch single (later reissued on a 3" CD single) featured an extended version of the song with an extra verse. The extended mix also appears on his compilation album The Platinum Collection. Both the 7 inch and 12 inch singles featured the B-side "Rite of Man", which was a rare instance of Oldfield singing lead vocal.

In 1991, the song was re-released in France, and in 1993 it was featured on promos for Elements in France and Spain. The 1993 reissue included "Bones" and "In the Pool" as B-sides, which had previously been released as B-sides with "To France". Furthermore, the name of the song was used for the 2013 Universal Music compilation album of Oldfield's music, Moonlight Shadow: The Collection.

== Live performances ==
Maggie Reilly sang "Moonlight Shadow" live when she toured with Oldfield in the 1980s. However, since then, other singers have performed the song live with Oldfield, including Anita Hegerland during the late 1980s, Pepsi Demacque at the Tubular Bells III premiere and at the Live Then & Now 1999 tour, Miriam Stockley at the Millennium concert and Nokia Night of the Proms in Germany, and Rosa Cedrón at Nokia Night of the Proms in Spain.

In 2020 Maggie Reilly released an updated version.

== Artwork ==
The original cover art is an enlargement of the lower right corner of the Crises album cover by UK artist Terry Ilott. This shows a man with his foot on a ledge with the sea and sky in the background. The moon, the tower and its shadow from the album cover cannot be seen on the single cover.

The artwork for the 1993 reissue followed the style of the Elements artwork in most countries.

== Production ==
An early version of the song was entitled "Midnight Passion" with vocals by British singer Hazel O'Connor. Along with Maggie Reilly, a girlfriend of one of the roadies when Oldfield was on tour, Oldfield used a rhyming dictionary and recorded many of the lyrics word by word.

According to bassist Phil Spalding the initial tracks recorded simultaneously for "Moonlight Shadow" were acoustic guitar (Oldfield), bass (Spalding), drums (Phillips) and electric guitar (Tim Renwick) in early February 1983 at Oldfield's studio in Denham, Buckinghamshire. Renwick's guitar track was apparently not used in the final track. The remaining tracks including the vocals and Oldfield on electric guitar were later overdubs.

According to Oldfield, Virgin Records were immediately happy with the song and wanted more pieces similar to it. Reilly also sang on "Foreign Affair" on Crises. An unplugged mix of the song appears on the 2013 Mercury Records reissue of the Crises album.

Oldfield later sampled the drums from "Moonlight Shadow" for the song "Man in the Rain" on his 1998 album, Tubular Bells III.

== Lyrical content ==
It has been suggested that the lyrics of the song are a reference to the murder of John Lennon, despite the fact that the events in the song do not correspond with those of Lennon's murder. Lennon was shot four times just before 11 pm, whereas in the song the time is 4 am and the number of shots is six. Also, the night Lennon was shot (8 December 1980) was a new moon, so there was no moonlight, and in the song, it is Saturday night, while Lennon was killed on a Monday night. When asked whether "Moonlight Shadow" is a reference to John Lennon's murder in a 1995 interview, Oldfield responded:

Not really... well, perhaps, when I look back on it, maybe it was. I actually arrived in New York that awful evening when he was shot and I was staying at the Virgin Records house in Perry Street, which was just a few blocks down the road from the Dakota Building where it happened, so it probably sank into my subconscious. It was originally inspired by a film I loved – Houdini, starring Tony Curtis, which was about attempts to contact Houdini after he'd died, through spiritualism... it was originally a song influenced by that, but a lot of other things must have crept in there without me realising it.

— Mike Oldfield

The song's closing verse, ‘Caught in the middle of a hundred and five, the night was heavy and the air was alive’ left many people confused regarding its meaning. Oldfield explained on his website in 1995, "Well, it was a hundred and five people, just signifying a large amount of people, and presumably it was a hundred and five rather than a hundred and four or whatever because ‘five’ rhymed with the next line!" In the extended version of the song, there is a final verse with several extra lines, one of which is ‘The crowd gathered just to leave him’. This helps explain where the large amount of people fit into the song.

== Video ==
There are two versions of the video: the full-length original, and a shorter one which omits a verse. The reason for the shorter version was for the requirements of some TV broadcasters, and the way both versions are edited suggests that Oldfield's touring guitarist "Ant" (Anthony Glynne) performs the second, overdriven half of the guitar solo, which is not the case. Also in the video is Oldfield's touring drummer, Pierre Moerlen, miming the part played by Simon Phillips on the recording. The music video was directed by Keith McMillan and shot on location at Hatfield House and Brocket Hall in Hertfordshire, England (the band are seen performing in Brocket Hall's ballroom and the girl, played by Francesca Gonshaw, runs in through the door and up the staircase in Brocket's hallway).

== Track listing ==
- 7-inch vinyl
1. "Moonlight Shadow" (7" mix) – 3:37
2. "Rite of Man" – 2:21
- 12-inch vinyl
1. "Moonlight Shadow" (Extended version) – 5:18
2. "Rite of Man" – 2:21
- West German vinyl
1. "Moonlight Shadow" – 3:37
2. "Moonlight Shadow" (Extended version) – 5:18
3. "Rite of Man" – 2:21
4. "To France" – 4:43
5. "Jungle Gardenia" – 2:45
6. "Taurus 3" – 2:25
- 1988 CD
1. "Moonlight Shadow" (Extended version) – 5:18
2. "Rite of Man" – 2:21
3. "To France" – 4:44
4. "Jungle Gardenia" – 2:44
- 1993 CD
1. "Moonlight Shadow" – 3:35
2. "Moonlight Shadow" (Extended version) – 5:18
3. "In the Pool"* – 3:40
4. "Bones"* – 3:19

(*: original B-sides for the 1984 "To France" single)

== Personnel ==
- Maggie Reilly – vocals
- Mike Oldfield – guitar, Fairlight CMI
- Phil Spalding – bass
- Simon Phillips – Tama drums

== Charts ==
=== Weekly charts ===
Chart (1983)	Peak position
Australia (Kent Music Report)	6
Austria (Ö3 Austria Top 40)	1
Belgium (Ultratop 50 Flanders)	1
Europe (Eurochart Hot 100)	1
Finland (Suomen virallinen lista)	2
France (IFOP)	3
Ireland (IRMA)	1
Italy (Musica e dischi)	1
Netherlands (Dutch Top 40)	2
Netherlands (Single Top 100)	1
New Zealand (Recorded Music NZ)	3
Norway (VG-lista)	1
South Africa (Springbok Radio)	7
Spain (AFYVE)	1
Sweden (Sverigetopplistan)	1
Switzerland (Schweizer Hitparade)	1
UK Singles (Official Charts)	4
West Germany (GfK)	2

Chart (2025)	Peak position
Poland (Polish Airplay Top 100)	59

=== Year-end charts ===
Chart (1983)	Position
Australia (Kent Music Report)	52
Austria (Ö3 Austria Top 40)	1
Belgium (Ultratop 50 Flanders)	7
France (IFOP)	31
Netherlands (Dutch Top 40)	5
Netherlands (Single Top 100)	11
New Zealand (RIANZ)	44
Switzerland (Schweizer Hitparade)	2
UK Singles (OCC)	29
West Germany (Media Control)	3

== Certifications ==
Region	Certification	Certified units/sales
Denmark (IFPI Danmark)	Gold	45,000^{‡}
Spain (Promusicae)	Gold	25,000^{^}
United Kingdom (BPI)	Silver	250,000^{^}
^{^} Shipments figures based on certification alone.^{‡} Sales+streaming figures based on certification alone.

== Appearances and influence in other media ==
"Moonlight Shadow" appeared on the soundtrack of the Italian comedy Vacanze di Natale (1983). It is also the theme song for Dave Angel, Eco-Warrior, a character in the BBC TV comedy series The Fast Show.

== Groove Coverage version ==
"Moonlight Shadow"

Single by Groove Coverage

from the album Covergirl
- Released: 2002
- Length: 2:52
- Label: Zeitgeist (Universal); Suprime:Music
- Songwriter: Mike Oldfield

Groove Coverage singles chronology
"Are U Ready" (2002)	"Moonlight Shadow" (2002)	"God Is a Girl" (2002)

Music video
- "Groove Coverage - Moonlight Shadow (Official Video)" on YouTube

In 2002, a cover by Groove Coverage peaked at No. 3 in the German Top 10 (simultaneously, a similar version of Oldfield's "To France" by Novaspace was in the German Top 30). "Moonlight Shadow" appeared on Groove Coverage's debut album, Covergirl. The vocals are by Melanie Munch, who is known by her stage name Mell. Aside from the single remixes, the album also contains a piano version, featuring piano by Verena Rehm.

=== Track listings ===
==== CD single ====
1. "Moonlight Shadow" (Radio version) – 2:52
2. "Moonlight Shadow" (Original radio edit) – 2:54
3. "Moonlight Shadow" (Extended version) – 6:56
4. "Moonlight Shadow" (Rocco remix) – 6:58
5. "Moonlight Shadow" (Warp Brothers remix) – 7:37
6. "Moonlight Shadow" (Video) – 2:53

==== Maxi single ====
1. "Moonlight Shadow" (Radio version) – 2:52
2. "Moonlight Shadow" (Original radio edit) – 2:59
3. "Moonlight Shadow" (Extended version) – 6:58
4. "Moonlight Shadow" (Rocco remix) – 6:58
5. "Beat Just Goes" – 3:53

==== Remix single ====
A-side

1. "Moonlight Shadow" (Extended version)

B-side

1. "Moonlight Shadow" (Club version)
2. "Beat Just Goes" (Club mix)

==== US maxi single ====
1. "Moonlight Shadow" (Josh Harris Radio Edit) – 3:46
2. "Moonlight Shadow" (Josh Harris Club Mix) – 7:21
3. "Moonlight Shadow" (Josh Harris Dub) – 6:39
4. "Moonlight Shadow" (French Club Mix) – 6:36
5. "Moonlight Shadow" (French Short Cut) – 3:05
6. "Moonlight Shadow" (Plastic Men UK Mix) – 6:16
7. "Moonlight Shadow" (Warp Brothers Remix) – 7:36
8. "Moonlight Shadow" (North Starz Remix) – 6:57
9. "Moonlight Shadow" (Alternate Radio Version) – 2:51
10. "Moonlight Shadow" (Original Mix) – 2:53
11. "Moonlight Shadow" (Extended Mix) – 6:54
12. "Moonlight Shadow" (Rocco Remix) – 6:56
13. "Moonlight Shadow" (A cappella) – 1:50
14. "Moonlight Shadow" (Pure & Direct Version) – 4:17

==== Weekly charts ====
Chart (2002–2007)	Peak position
Australia (ARIA)	39
Austria (Ö3 Austria Top 40)	5
Belgium (Ultratop 50 Flanders)	50
Germany (GfK)	3
Hungary (Dance Top 40)	25
Hungary (Rádiós Top 40)	36
Netherlands (Single Top 100)	68
Switzerland (Schweizer Hitparade)	52
UK Singles (Official Charts)	100

==== Year-end charts ====
Chart (2002)	Position
Austria (Ö3 Austria Top 40)	31
Germany (Media Control)	19

== See also ==
- List of European number-one hits of 1983
- List of number-one singles of 1983 (Ireland)
- List of number-one hits of 1983 (Italy)
- List of number-one singles of 1983 (Spain)
- List of number-one singles and albums in Sweden
- List of number-one singles of the 1980s (Switzerland)
- VG-lista 1964 to 1994
