= Special D. =

German DJ and dance music artist (born 1980)

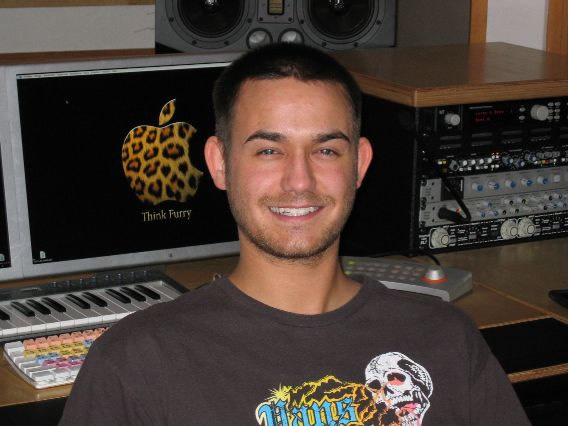
- Special D in his studio

Background information
- Also known as: Special D
- Born: Dennis Horstmann; 16 September 1980 (age 45)
- Origin: Hamburg, Germany
- Genres: Hands up
- Occupations: DJ, producer
- Years active: 2003–present
- Labels: Mental Madness Records, Kontor Records, Central Station Records
- Website: Special D MySpace website

Dennis Horstmann (born 16 September 1980), known as Special D., is a German DJ and dance musician who was particularly popular in the Netherlands, where he won the Best Dance International award at the 2004 TMF NL awards. He was also popular among the Eurodance scene in North America. The "D" in Special D comes from the DJ's first name, Dennis.

His best-known track, "Come with Me", reached number 6 on the UK Singles Chart and number 4 on the Irish Singles Chart in April 2004. He proceeded making more tracks, such as "You" and "Here I Am", which were frequently played on European dance floors.

His music featured in Crank: High Voltage.

He has started using Ableton Live in his live sets.

== Discography ==
=== Albums ===
- Reckless (2004)

=== Singles ===
Special D. "You" (2004)
25-second sample of "You."

Year	Single	Peak chart positions									Certifications	Album
Year	Single	AUS	AUT	BEL (FL)	DEN	FIN	GER	IRE	NED	UK	Certifications	Album
2003	"Come with Me"	73	14	—	—	—	13	4	10	6	BPI: Platinum	Reckless
2003	"Home Alone"	73	37	27	—	—	17	—	11	—		Reckless
2004	"Nothing I Won't Do"	—	37	49	—	—	45	—	8	160		Reckless
2004	"You"	—	—	36	—	—	—	—	18	—		Reckless
2005	"Here I Am"	—	—	—	19	7	66	—	—	—		Reckless
2011	"Ich Explodier" (Special D. Presents Psychonautn)	—	—	—	—	—	—	—	—	—		Singles only
2013	"Discoland"	—	—	—	—	—	—	—	—	—		Singles only
2014	"Raver" (with Jens O.)	—	—	—	—	—	—	—	—	—		Singles only
2015	"Oxygene" (with Pulsedriver)	—	—	—	—	—	—	—	—	—		Singles only
2015	"Chief Party Rocker"	—	—	—	—	—	—	—	—	—		Singles only
2015	Forever Young"	—	—	—	—	—	—	—	—	—		Singles only
2015	"Champion Sound" (with Rocco)	—	—	—	—	—	—	—	—	—		Singles only
2016	"Elysium" (with Scott Brown)	—	—	—	—	—	—	—	—	—		Singles only
2017	"Hardcore Doodle"	—	—	—	—	—	—	—	—	—		Singles only
2020	"Suck My ... !" (with Andy Judge)	—	—	—	—	—	—	—	—	—		Singles only
"—" denotes releases that did not chart
