= Poison (Alice Cooper song) =

1989 single by Alice Cooper

Single by Alice Cooper

from the album Trash
- B-side: "Trash"
- Released: July 17, 1989
- Genre: Glam metal; hard rock
- Length: 4:28
- Label: Epic
- Songwriters: Alice Cooper; Desmond Child; John McCurry
- Producer: Desmond Child

Alice Cooper singles chronology
"Freedom" (1987)	"Poison" (1989)	"Bed of Nails" (1989)

Music video
- "Poison" on YouTube

"Poison" is a song by American musician Alice Cooper. Written by Cooper, producer Desmond Child and guitarist John McCurry, the song was released as a single in July 1989 from Cooper's 18th album, Trash. It became one of Cooper's biggest hit singles in the United States, peaking at number seven on the Billboard Hot 100 chart. The song performed better in the United Kingdom, peaking at number two on the UK Singles Chart.

"Poison" was ranked by Billboard as the 91st-most-successful song of 1989, while Ultimate Classic Rock ranked it as the "7th best Alice Cooper song", commenting "Poison sounds like a typical '80s pop-metal number at times, but Cooper’s intensity brings it to a whole other level." The song's main riff was written by guitarist John McCurry, who two years earlier had used it for the John Waite track "Encircled".

== Music video ==
There are two versions of the video to the song, one of which shows Alice Cooper being chained to a torture rack and singing while a ghostly woman looms over him and caresses him. The original video had to be censored for showings during the day, due to shots of a topless model. Rana Kennedy plays the part in the video but the topless scene were shot with a body double. This is notably visible in the video.

== Personnel ==
- Alice Cooper – lead and backing vocals
- John McCurry – lead and rhythm guitar
- Hugh McDonald – bass guitar, backing vocals
- Bobby Chouinard – drums
- Alan St. James – keyboards

== Charts ==
=== Weekly charts ===
Chart (1989)	Peak position
Australia (ARIA)	3
Belgium (Ultratop 50 Flanders)	22
Canada Top Singles (RPM)	39
Europe (Eurochart Hot 100)	9
Finland (Suomen virallinen lista)	7
Ireland (IRMA)	3
Netherlands (Dutch Top 40)	10
Netherlands (Single Top 100)	8
New Zealand (Recorded Music NZ)	2
Norway (VG-lista)	3
Sweden (Sverigetopplistan)	10
Switzerland (Schweizer Hitparade)	13
UK Singles (Official Charts)	2
US Billboard Hot 100	7
US Mainstream Rock (Billboard)	15
West Germany (GfK)	25

=== Year-end charts ===
Chart (1989)	Position
Australia (ARIA)	18
Europe (Eurochart Hot 100)	67
Netherlands (Dutch Top 40)	94
Netherlands (Single Top 100)	61
New Zealand (RIANZ)	43
UK Singles (OCC)	40
US Billboard Hot 100	91

== Certifications ==
Region	Certification	Certified units/sales
Australia (ARIA)	Platinum	70,000^{^}
Canada (Music Canada)	Gold	50,000^{^}
Denmark (IFPI Danmark)	Platinum	90,000^{‡}
Germany (BVMI)	Platinum	600,000^{‡}
New Zealand (RMNZ)	2× Platinum	60,000^{‡}
Sweden (GLF)	Gold	25,000^{^}
United Kingdom (BPI)	Platinum	600,000^{‡}
United States (RIAA)	Gold	500,000^{^}
^{^} Shipments figures based on certification alone.^{‡} Sales+streaming figures based on certification alone.

== Cover versions ==
- The Vandals, 1993
- Groove Coverage, 2003
- Husky Rescue, 2007
- Tarja, 2007
- Baracuda, 2008 (sampled in "Where Is The Love", alongside Amaranth by Nightwish)
- Alex Day, 2013
- Powerwolf, 2023
- Exit Eden, 2024 (Femmes Fatales)

== Film and media usage ==
- Tango & Cash, 1989
- The Jackal, 1997
- End of Days, 1999
- Mean Creek, 2004
- Pineapple Express, 2008
- A modified version of the song was featured in a February 2011 television ad campaign for the Volkswagen Passat.
- Spartacus Vengeance, 2012
