= Gordon Giltrap discography =

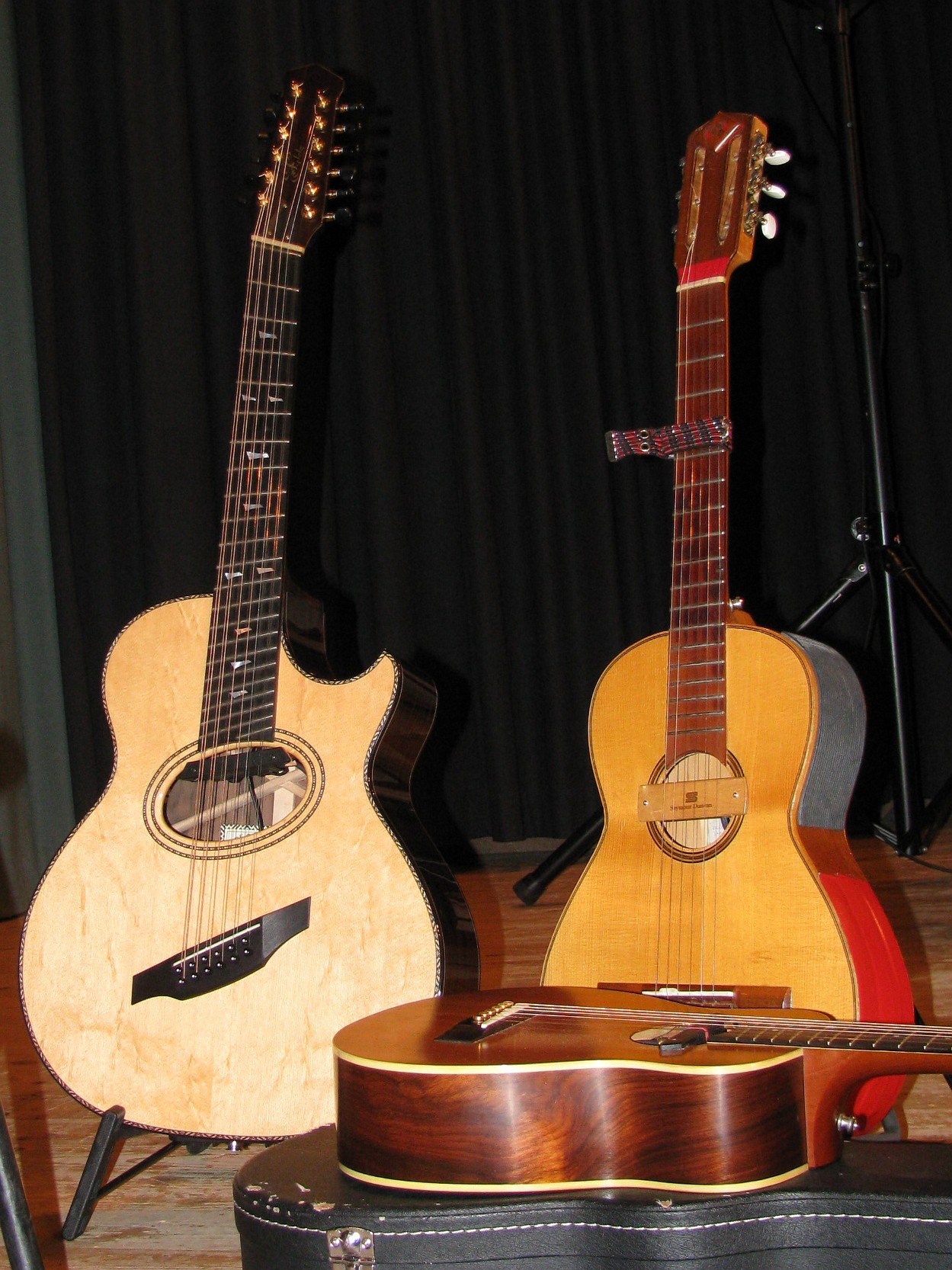
- Fanned fret guitars used by Gordon Giltrap.
- Studio albums: 22
- EPs: 1
- Live albums: 7
- Compilation albums: 15
- Singles: 11
- Video albums: 2

Gordon Giltrap is an English guitarist and composer. His discography consists of 22 studio albums, 7 live albums, 15 compilations, 2 videos, 1 EP, and 11 singles.

== Studio albums ==
- 1968: Gordon Giltrap (Transatlantic Records) - later reissued on cassette as The Early Days (Allegro ALC) with a different track sequence
- 1969: Portrait (Transatlantic)
- 1971: A Testament of Time (MCA Records)
- 1973: Giltrap (Philips Records)
- 1976: Visionary (The Electric Record Company, catalogue no. TRIX 2)
- 1977: Perilous Journey (The Electric Record Company, catalogue no. TRIX 4)
- 1978: Fear of the Dark (The Electric Record Company)
- 1979: The Peacock Party (PVK)
- 1981: Airwaves (PVK) - The Gordon Giltrap Band
- 1982: Soundwaves (KPM) - The Gordon Giltrap Band
- 1984: In At The Deep End (KPM)
- 1987: Elegy (Filmtrax) - reissued in 2000 by La Cooka Ratcha
- 1987: A Midnight Clear (Modern Music) - a collection of Christmas carols
- 1995: Music for the Small Screen (Munchkin)
- 1998: Troubadour (K-tel)
- 1998: Down the River (K-tel)
- 2002: Under This Blue Sky (La Cooka Ratcha)
- 2003: Remember This (La Cooka Ratcha) - primarily cover songs
- 2004: Drifter (La Cooka Ratcha)
- 2007: Secret Valentine (La Cooka Ratcha / Voiceprint)
- 2010: Shining Morn (Floating World)

== Cassette-only releases ==
- 1991: The Eye of the Wind (Heartsongs) - Giltrap composition performed by The Birmingham Schools Concert Orchestra
- 1995: The Brotherhood Suite (Munchkin) - with the Nottinghamshire Education String Orchestra at the Albert Hall

== Live albums ==
- 1981. Live (Cube Records) - at Oxford Polytechnic on 9 March 1979 - reissued in 2000 on La Cooka Ratcha as Live at Oxford
- 1992: On a Summer's Night (Music Maker) - live Aug. 1991 at the Warwick Festival.
- 1995: Live at the BBC (BBC Worldwide)
- 2003: The Gordon Giltrap Band Live 1981 (La Cooka Ratcha)
- 2003: Fingers Of Fire (ARC)
- 2006: Captured From a Point in Time (Hypertension) - a reissue of 2003 Fingers of Fire with bonus track "The Dodo's Dream"
- 2004: Live at Ambergate (La Cooka Ratcha / Voiceprint) - live 20–22 August 2002 in Shining Cliff Woods, Ambergate, Derbyshire - a binaural recording
- 2004: The River Sessions (River Records) - recorded by Radio Clyde on 29 November 1979 at the Magnum theatre, Irvine
- 2006: Gordon Giltrap And Friends At The Symphony Hall Birmingham (La Cooka Ratcha)
- 2009: As It Happens... (Voiceprint) - live January 2007 at Dorchester Arts Centre

== Compilations ==
- 1980: Performance (K-tel) - includes "Theme From The Waltons" which was released as a single
- 1981: Platinum Collection (Cube)
- 1990: Guitarist (Music Maker)
- 1991: The Best Of Gordon Giltrap (Prestige)
- 1992: The Solo Album (Resurgent Music) released in 2000 - solo acoustic performance collection
- 1993: Gordon Giltrap / Portrait (Transatlantic) - compilation of two albums
- 2000: Part of the Picture (Snapper Music)
- 2001: Collection (La Cooka Ratcha) contains some rare and previously unreleased music, as well as music from previous albums
- 2001: Acoustic Troubadour (La Cooka Ratcha) - reissue of Troubadour with extra disc containing guitar-only versions of the original songs
- 2007: Sixty Minutes With Gordon Giltrap (Voiceprint Records)
- 2010: The Peacock Party & Airwaves ... Plus (Edsel) - compilation of two albums and five bonus live cuts
- 2010: Music For The Small Screen / The Solo Album (Edsel) - compilation of two albums
- 2010: Remember This/Janschology - compilation of two albums
- 2010: Troubadour / Live At The Ventnor Winter Gardens (Edsel) - compilation of Troubadour with bonus tracks and a DVD of a May 2008 concert
- 2015: Time To Reflect: A Personal Anthology (Trapeze)

== Library albums ==
- 1979: Guitar masterclass, Compositions for solo and accompanied guitar written and performed by leading exponents (KPM 1237) - 6 out of 24 tracks by Gordon Giltrap (the others are by Richard Harvey, Graeme Taylor and Kevin Peek)
- 1981: Airwaves (Themes TIM 1038) - 16 tracks by Gordon Giltrap Band (Side A: Contemporary rock guitar, Side B: Featured acoustic guitar)
- 1984: In At The Deep End, The distinctive style of Gordon Giltrap and the Gordon Giltrap Band (KPM 1330) - 19 tracks by Gordon Giltrap and the Gordon Giltrap Band

== EPs ==
- 2000: Janschology EP (Resurgent) - tribute to Bert Jansch

== Singles ==
- 1977: "Lucifer's Cage" / "The Echoing Green" (The Electric Record Company)
- 1977: "Heartsong" / "The Deserter" (The Electric Record Company)
- 1978: "Oh Well" / "Reflections And Despair" (The Electric Record Company)
- 1978-11: "Weary Eyes" / "Nightrider" (The Electric Record Company)
- 1978: "Fear Of The Dark (edited version)" / "Melancholy Lullaby" (The Electric Record Company)
- 1979: "Fear Of The Dark" / "Inner Dream (live)" (The Electric Record Company)
- 1979: "Fear Of The Dark (edited version)" / "Catwalk blues" (live) & "Inner Dream" (live) (12", The Electric Record Company, LWOT29)
- 1979: "Fear Of The Dark (edited version)" / "Catwalk blues" (live) & "Inner Dream" (live) (12", Picture Disc, The Electric Record Company, LWOP29)
- 1979: "O Jerusalem" / "Party Piece" (The Electric Record Company)
- 1981: "Hocus Pocus" / "Dodo's Dream" (PVK)
- 1981: "Chi Mai" (with Juan Martin) / "After the Storm" (Juan Martin only) (PVK)
- 1982: "Sunburst" / "Headwind" (PVK)
- 1988: "Coppers Will Turn Into Silver" / "In The Bleak Midwinter" (The Birmingham Mail) with Malcolm Stent

== Video ==
- 2011: Double Vision in Vision DVD (Floating World) with Raymond Burley - filmed live in 2006 at Stickford Church and Fulston Manor
- 2013: Live at Huntingdon Hall DVD (Wienerworld) - Live performances and extra material

== Music Books ==
- 1991: Gordon Giltrap, A Special Collection book (International Music Publications) ISBN 0863598218
- 2003: Classic Giltrap book (Registry Publications) ISBN 1898466491, 9781898466499 - five compositions by Giltrap arranged for classical guitar by Raymond Burley
- 2005: Total Giltrap: Guitar Encounters of the Fingerstyle Kind book + CD (Mel Bay) ISBN 9780786656769

== As a member of Accolade ==
- 1970: Accolade (Capitol Records)

== Collaborations ==
=== With Joan Armatrading ===
- 1976: Stereo Pop Special-135 (BBC Transcription Services) - live 13 November 1976 at the Paris Theatre, London

=== With Raymond Burley ===
- 2009: Double Visions (Floating World)

=== With Martin Green and Carol Lee Sampson ===
- 2011 Echoes of Heaven (K-tel)

=== With Ric Sanders ===
- 1989: One to One (Nico Polo)

=== With Martin Taylor ===
- 1991: A Matter of Time (Prestige) reissued with extra songs in 2005 on P-3 as Giltrap and Taylor.
- 2012: Best of the Essential Years: Gordon Giltrap & Martin Taylor (Xelon Entertainment)

=== With Rick Wakeman ===
- 2009: From Brush and Stone (Gonzo)

=== With Oliver Wakeman ===
- 2013: Ravens & Lullabies (Esoteric Recordings)

=== With Paul Ward ===
- 2017: The Last Of England (Psychotron)

=== With The Sheffield Philharmonic Orchestra ===
- 2005: Giltrap (self-released) - live 30 March 2005 at Symphony Hall, Birmingham and 30–31 July 2004 at St. Paul's Hall, University of Huddersfield

== As composer ==
- 1971: Accolade - Accolade 2 (Regal Zonophone) - track 9, "William Taplin"

== Appears on ==
- 1969: Pauline Filby - Show Me A Rainbow (Herald Records)
- 1972: Graham Kendrick - Footsteps On The Sea (Key) - acoustic guitar
- 1973: Dave Ellis - Album (Sonet) - second guitarist on track 8, "Something wrong"
- 1973: Larry Norman - Only Visiting This Planet (Verve Records) - guitar on track 2, "The Outlaw"
- 1979: Nutshell - Believe It Or Not (Myrrh Records) - guitar on track 10, "Thief In The Night"
- 1980: Adrian Snell with The Royal Philharmonic Orchestra - The Passion (Kingsway) - acoustic guitar
- 2015: Merry Hell - The Ghost in our House And Other Stories... (Mrs Casey) - guitar on track 2, "Leave a Light On"
- 2017: Bert Jansch On the Edge of a Dream (Earth) - guitar on track 4-8, "Chambertin"
- 2017: John Shuttleworth - The A1111 And Other Ones! (Free Range Product) - guitar on track 2-13, "Sutton On Sea"

== Individual songs on compilation albums by various artists ==
- 1968: Various Artists - Listen Here! (A Transatlantic Records sampler) - Contains "In love with a stranger" by Gordon Giltrap
- 1996: Various Artists - Twang! (– A Tribute to Hank Marvin & The Shadows, Pangea) - Contains "Wonderful Land" by Tony Iommi with Gordon Giltrap on Acoustic Guitar, Tony Iommi on Guitar, Bev Bevan on Drums, Don Airey on Keyboards, Neil Murray on Bass)
- 1997: Various Artists - The Sky Goes All The Way Home (A Down's Syndrome Fundraising Compilation, Voiceprint) - Contains "Fell runner" by Gordon Giltrap
- 1998: Various Artists - Total Guitar CD vol. 44 (Accompanying CD to music magazine Total Guitar) - Contains "Quest for Nonsuch" by Gordon Giltrap
