= John Bailey (luthier) =

British luthier (1931–2011)

- Born: 1931; England
- Died: 2011 (aged 79–80)
- Occupation: Luthier

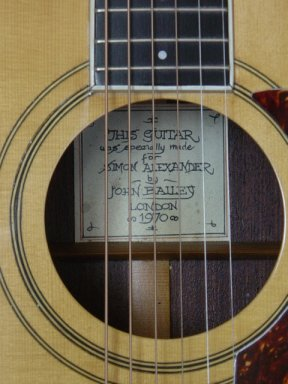

John Bailey (1931–2011) was a British luthier who made and repaired guitars and other stringed instruments during the 1960s revival of English folk music and beyond. Bailey lived in London until 1972 when he moved to Dartmouth in Devon.

In the mid to late 1970s he moved back to London and for a time he was the Course Organiser of the Musical Instrument Repair Course (set up by Selwyn Jones, Paul Harvey and John Stone) at Merton College in Wimbledon. The demands of academic management however did not suit him and he was happiest when in the classroom passing on his skills to students. Hence in the late 70's he moved back to Dartmouth and he continued to make instruments there into the 1990s.

John was originally a woodwork teacher at a school in Hendon and made instruments in his spare time. His business card from the early seventies said "Albert John Bailey – Violin Maker"

== Books ==
He wrote two textbooks on making instruments, Making a Folk Guitar and Making an Appalachian Dulcimer, that were published by The English Folk Dance and Song Society, Cecil Sharp House.

Illustrated with line drawings, cover designs by Bailey's wife Maurine and a few photographs by Russ Woolnough, these scarce booklets are titles in The Folk Shop Instrumental Series; complete texts on how to make acoustic folk-style instruments.

George Lowden the Irish luthier has talked about the influence of Bailey's book at the start of his professional career as a luthier:

1973 – After a fair bit of prayer! (I needed all the help I could get) I decided to make guitars professionally and armed with some wood, basic woodworking tools and an excellent booklet by English Luthier John Bailey, I began the journey.

== Notable users ==
Bailey's instruments have been played by many well known musicians:

- Bert Jansch's first instrument was a Zenith – 'marketed as the Lonnie Donegan guitar' – which he was still playing as his star rose in the Sixties. "I borrowed the guitars on my first album – Martin Carthy lent me his Martin 0028. The prestige of owning a Martin was just beginning then. Later I had a hand-built guitar from John Bailey which I loved but which was stolen. Then after I left Pentangle I had a contract with Yamaha, and the first thing they gave me was this FG1500. I first played it on LA Turnaround; it got battered over the years, has burns on it and eventually I gave it to my son but retrieved it to get it restored.". Having owned a John Bailey acoustic for a few months (his first personally owned guitar since 1960), Bert had recently acquired an experimental Bailey electric, for use with the band (Pentangle), and a twelve-string acoustic. That particular twelve string guitar is now owned by Soren Venema, owner of Palm Guitars in Amsterdam.
- Gordon Giltrap: "I like their (Brook) guitars which sort of remind a little of my John Bailey that I used for SO many years on SO many albums!" "22nd July 2011: It is with great sadness that I received an e-mail from Maureen Bailey, the wife of John Bailey informing me that John passed away two days ago. John was without a doubt one of THE great pioneers of guitar making here in Britain. I shall be writing a more detailed dedication to this great man in next months news page. In the meantime we send our deepest condolences to his widow Maureen and their family. A sad day indeed. Gordon."!" "Although it had been many years since I had seen John, he was always a part of my life through the beautiful guitars he made. I still own the stunning twin neck that he made in the late 60's for guitarist and author Ralph Denyer. I bought the guitar in about 1975 and used it on stage, in the studio and featured it on album sleeves over the coming years. I guess the most iconic photograph of me with that guitar was on the inner sleeve of The Visionary album from 1976. I foolishly sold it in the early 80's via Bert Jansch's guitar shop. In fact Bert re strung that very guitar to sell it to a Mr John Garvey. Many years later I was able to purchase it back from John, and it has been with me ever since. It made its last appearance on my Guitar Maestros DVD. I acquired my first Bailey guitar in the late 60's, brand new from the maker who I think took a shine to me and let me have it at a silly price of something like £70. Such was the generosity of John Bailey. Sadly I sold it a few years back when times got hard. I used the guitar for much of the 70's and early 80's and it has its place in my musical history on many a GG recording, specifically Heartsong where I high strung it. It formed the logo for my re releases on Voiceprint. I really can't remember all the many players that owned John's instruments, but here is a list of just some that I can remember. Bert Jansch, John Renbourn, Roy Harper, Al Stewart, Benny Gallagher, Richard Thompson, Ralph Denyer, Joni Mitchell. There are many more believe me! The first Bailey guitar I saw was being played by Bert Jansch at Les Cousins, and I immediately fell in love with its looks and sound and vowed that one day I would have one. I can still remember asking Bert the make of his guitar. In fact it was the first time I had ever spoken to the man. How ironic that our first conversation should be in reference to a John Bailey guitar! I would dearly love to get my original one back or even own a nice example of a six string, but I doubt one will come up for sale, such is their rarity these days. John was indeed a pioneer of guitar making and was, to my knowledge one of the first to write a book about building a steel string guitar. This man will be greatly missed, and it was whilst going through my drawer of bits and pieces that I found a lovely note from him along with a brand new hand written label to go in my twin neck if I decided to replace the rather torn original. I decided to stick with the original. Maybe I shall frame that note and label as a memory of the great man! We shall miss getting a Christmas card from John and Maureen. John was indeed a pioneer and the first and probably last of his kind. The last time I actually saw John was when he attended my first wedding in 1970. He gave as a wedding present a beautiful Appalachian Dulcimer with heart shaped sound holes, which I used in concert and on an album track in 1973. The piece was called Spellbrook Meadow. Rest in peace John."
- Roy Harper: Then there's my own man, John Bailey. I haven't seen John for years but we're in contact. He made me a guitar years ago that is still in use. He is threatening to make me another at the moment. Says he's still got some of the same wood! Wood .. Now there's a thing. Different properties. I think that Brazilian Rosewood is better than Indian for guitar making. I'm back playing my old Bailey now. It has its faults, like it's difficult to tune the B string!, and it doesn't strum as well as it picks. Nevertheless, it reminds me of 'Flat Baroque and Berserk' every time I play it. So, of a night, I just settle into playing that there A minor chord that goes with 'Davey' or the D in 'East of the Sun' and I'm off and running again."
- Richard Thompson: "On the early Fairport stuff, I would have borrowed my friend/producer Tod Lloyd's Martin D28, or used Sandy's Gibson J45. Tod then sold me his John Bailey Acoustic, which I used till 1972. To get a guitar set up, you went to your favourite West End music shop – Selmers, Macari's, Sound City... my Dad's old army buddy ran Lew Davis' in the Charing Cross Road, so I had a bit of an 'in' there. In the Fairport era, people like John Bailey and Sam Li would do refrets, and yer roadies would know who to take amps to, or blown speakers."
- Al Stewart: John produced a six string guitar in black for Al Stewart in 1967

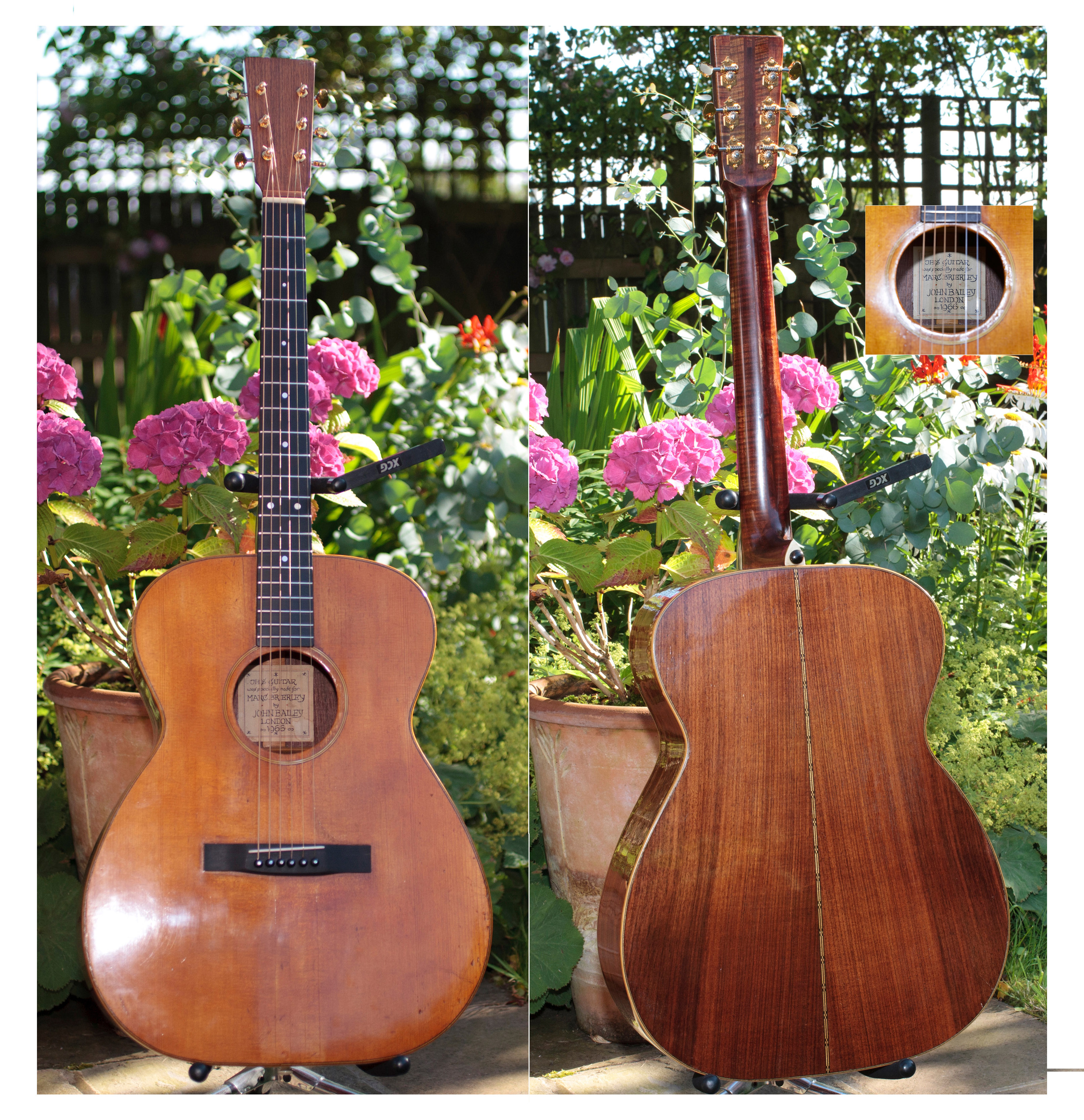
Hand made acoustic guitar made by John Bailey in 1966 for Marc Brierley

- Marc Brierley: I called John in the spring of 1966 on the recommendation of Bert Jansch, and asked him to make me a guitar in the Martin 000-28 style. We met at his house in North London and talked about what I wanted. Since I'd just sold my guitar to a friend to help her out at short notice, John kindly lent me one for the time being. I went up to his house every Saturday afternoon and looked at the progress, choosing the parts as they were presented: the back and sides, the top, the neck and so on. After six weeks it was ready to collect. I loved it immediately. John charged me £80 - not a lot for a Brazilian rosewood, Italian spruce topped hand made instrument. He was a true pioneer of the English luthier scene and influenced many makers who came later. God bless you John and thank you so much.
- Anthony Phillips (formerly guitarist with the band Genesis) played a Bailey six-string on the "Guitar Song" demo in 1973. This was experimentation with different guitars recording with two Revoxes.
- Colin Wilkie: "In 1965, John Bailey custom built me a beautiful six-string guitar which I have used constantly ever since on gordnose how many gigs, TV & radio shows and recordings. I told him exactly what I wanted, and he built it for me ( the strange shaped soundhole – which I like – is the same as the one on my old Grimshaw, it's distinctive, and I've always believed if anyone nicked me Bailey I'd know it straight away from the soundhole alone, not to mention several other little distinguishing bits and pieces. She is, naturally, a wee bit battered ( rather like me) and scratched, but the tone just gets better and better. A truly amazing instrument, and I've never felt the need for another, nor had the desire to switch; he also built me, to my specifications, a 12-string guitar and a six-string mountain dulcimer, and made my wife, Shirley a 3-string dulcimer– John was certainly a master of his art: and a hell of a nice bloke too. All his instruments are invaluable and irreplaceable. I just took a quick butcher's at me homepage, and in all the pictures apart from the one with Odetta ( third in top row ) and the one with John Pearse ( I'm hammering his Martin – don't recall why –fourth in row four ) and the banjo and drums shots, it's always the Bailey I'm playing."
- Colan Campbell (formerly guitarist with the Australian folk band Extradition): "Firstly, if anybody is in touch with John then please give him my regards. We haven't met since 1965 when I went to his house to buy one of his experimental guitars. It was a Brazilian rosewood six-string, extremely deep, and the label simply read 'This guitar was made by John Bailey'. I played it throughout my years in Australia, including on a couple of albums, but it was stolen in Paris during the late 1970s. I'd dearly love it back, of course, and perhaps John has a photograph of it as I do not. He'll remember it, I'm sure, as he let me have it for a fraction of its worth. Anyway, good luck to you all and may the John Bailey legend flourish, deservedly."

== Bibliography ==
- Bailey, John (1965). Making a Folk Guitar (1st, The Folk Shop Instrumental Series ed.). The English Folk Dance and Song Society. ISBN 0-85418-038-9.
- Bailey, John (1966). Making an Appalachian Dulcimer (1st, The Folk Shop Instrumental Series ed.). The English Folk Dance and Song Society. ISBN 0-85418-039-7.
