= Children of the Sun (The Sallyangie album) =

Studio album by The Sallyangie
- Released: 1 January 1969
- Recorded: August 1968
- Genre: Folk
- Length: 42:59
- Label: Transatlantic (UK), Warner Bros/Seven Arts (USA)
- Producer: Nathan Joseph

Re-issue cover
- Re-issued cover

Mike Oldfield chronology
Children of the Sun (1 January 1969)	Tubular Bells (1973)

Sally Oldfield chronology
Children of the Sun (1969)	Water Bearer (1978)

Professional ratings
Review scores
Source	Rating
Allmusic	3/5 stars

Children of the Sun is a 1969 album by British folk duo The Sallyangie (consisting of siblings Mike and Sally Oldfield). The album was produced by Nathan Joseph, founder of the record label Transatlantic Records. It was reissued in 2002, with bonus tracks and a second disc, and again reissued on 26 September 2011 by Esoteric Recordings.

The album pre-dates Mike Oldfield's debut solo album, Tubular Bells, by 4 years and Sally Oldfield's Water Bearer by 9 years.

== Track listing ==
All songs written by Mike and Sally Oldfield

=== Original release ===
1. "Strangers" – 1:32
2. "Lady Mary" – 3:41
3. "Children of the Sun" – 4:56
4. "A Lover for All Seasons" – 3:42
5. "River Song" – 3:40
6. "Banquet on the Water" – 4:28
7. "Balloons" – 5:28
8. "Midsummer Night's Happening" – 4:08
9. "Love in Ice Crystals" – 3:00
10. "Changing Colours" – 0:21
11. "Chameleon" – 2:20
12. "Milk Bottle" – 0:31
13. "Murder of the Children of San Francisco" – 4:00
14. "Strangers (reprise)" – 1:12

=== Re-issue ===
Disc 1

1. "Strangers" (1:17)
2. "Lady Mary" (3:43)
3. "Children of the Sun" (5:06)
4. "A Lover for All Seasons" (3:43)
5. "River Song" (3:41)
6. "Banquet on the Water" (4:44)
7. "Balloons" (5:29)
8. "Midsummer Night's Happening" (4:12)
9. "Love in Ice Crystals" (3:06)
10. "Changing Colours" (0:25)
11. "Chameleon" (2:26)
12. "Milk Bottle" (0:35)
13. "The Murder of the Children of San Francisco" (4:00)
14. "Twilight Song" (2:35)
15. "The Song of the Healer" (3:03)
16. "Strangers" (1:13)

Disc 2

1. "Children of the Sun" (minus intro) (4:11)
2. "Mrs Moon and the Thatched Shop" (6:18)
3. "Branches" (6:54)
4. "A Sad Song for Rosie" (2:14)
5. "Colours of the World" (2:30)
6. "Two Ships" (3:17)
7. "Child of Allah" (Only on the 2011 reissue) (2:55)
8. "Lady Go Lightly" (Only on the 2011 reissue) (3:03)

== Personnel ==
- Sally Oldfield: vocals
- Mike Oldfield: acoustic guitar, vocals
- Terry Cox: percussion
- David Palmer: arrangement
- Ray Warleigh: flute
