= Listen Here! (sampler album) =

Compilation album by Various artists
- Released: 1968
- Genre: Folk, rock, experimental
- Label: Transatlantic

Listen Here! is a sampler album released by Transatlantic Records in 1968. It was the second significant UK contemporary music sampler release in the period.

Transatlantic, founded in 1961, was a prototype for many of the UK independent labels that followed it. It established the UK folk-rock market, first by importing American records, and then by recording British artists. With the advent of psychedelia and flower power, the Transatlantic stable of artists achieved increasing popularity, culminating in the formation of the supergroup Pentangle. Meanwhile, Transatlantic had been extending its eclecticism, recording such as the eccentric audio collageist Ron Geesin, and The Purple Gang, whose "Granny Takes A Trip" was banned by the BBC in 1967.

CBS had released the extremely successful contemporary music budget sampler with The Rock Machine Turns You On in 1967. Before CBS could follow up, Transatlantic released Listen Here! early in 1968. Like Rock Machine the record was priced at 14/11d (£0.75), but Transatlantic took promotion one stage further by not only printing the track listing on the front, but also the price. The record was designed to preview not only the forthcoming Pentangle double album, but solo records by members Bert Jansch and John Renbourn. Listen Here! also served to introduce a new group The Sallyangie, with siblings Mike and Sally Oldfield.

== Track listing ==
=== Side 1 ===
1. "Travellin Song" - The Pentangle
2. "Eight Frames a Second" - Ralph McTell
3. "In Love With a Stranger" - Gordon Giltrap
4. "Tic Tocative" - Bert Jansch & John Renbourn
5. "Song" - John Renbourn
6. "The Circle Game" - The Ian Campbell Group

=== Side 2 ===
1. "Urge for Going" - The Johnstons
2. "Harvest Your Thought of Love" - Bert Jansch
3. "Love in Ice Crystals" - The Sallyangie
4. "Blues for Dominique" - Bob Bunting
5. "Certainly Random" - Ron Geesin
6. "Granny Takes a Trip" - The Purple Gang
