= Secret Valentine =

Secret Valentine may refer to:

- Secret Valentine EP, an EP by We the Kings
- Secret Valentine (album), an album by Gordon Giltrap
