= Christopher Pyne (disambiguation) =

Christopher Pyne may refer to:

- Christopher Pyne (born 1967), Australian politician
- Chris Pyne (1939–1995), English jazz trombonist

== See also ==
- Chris Pine (born 1980), American actor
