= Light + Shade =

2005 album by Mike Oldfield

Studio album by Mike Oldfield
- Released: 26 September 2005
- Recorded: 2004–2005
- Studio: Buckinghamshire
- Genres: Electronic; new-age
- Length: 82:01
- Label: Mercury
- Producer: Mike Oldfield

Mike Oldfield chronology
Tubular Bells 2003 (2003)	Light + Shade (2005)	Music of the Spheres (2008)

Singles from Light + Shade
- 1. "Surfing" Released: 2005 (promo disc)

Light + Shade is the 23rd studio album by English musician Mike Oldfield. It was the first album to be released by Oldfield following his signing with Mercury Records. The album was released on 26 September 2005. Some of the music on these CDs was originally released, with alternate mixes, on the soundtracks to his virtual reality games, Tres Lunas and Maestro.

== Background ==
The album offers two genres of music for two different moods, a division which Oldfield created by making two CDs of music. The first nine tracks are dubbed "Light" and feature brighter and quiet pieces; the second half of the album is the "Shade" portion and brings in a much darker feel. Many of the tracks on the album are remixed and/or extended versions of the music from the Tres Lunas video game.

On his official website, Oldfield reported that besides the standard version of the album, a 5.1 surround mix of the album had been produced as well. However, as of 2024 it has not been released. Four tracks from Light + Shade were made available in the U-MYX format for fans to mix themselves.

Oldfield's attraction to vocal modification surfaced again, this time in the form of Vocaloid, a virtual vocal software package. The voice of "Miriam" was used. The virtual voice "Miriam" is based on the voice of Miriam Stockley, with whom Oldfield had previously worked. "Tears of an Angel" also featured Miriam singing alongside the Cantor software.

The tracks "First Steps" and "Ringscape" were arranged by Robyn Smith. Christopher von Deylen makes a guest appearance on "Nightshade". Oldfield repaid the favour by playing guitar on "Morgentau", a track from the Tag und Nacht album for Deylen's band Schiller.

"Quicksilver" is an alternative name for the metal mercury, which is also the name of his then-current record label. On Oldfield's following album, Music of the Spheres, he repeats this trick, with a track title "Musica Universalis" which when translated is Universal Music.

The track "Blackbird" is named after one of Oldfield's motorbikes, a Honda CBR1100XX Blackbird.

The track "Closer" is an instrumental reworking of the 19th century Christian hymn Nearer, My God, to Thee. The same tune is utilized again for the bonus track "Prés de Toi".

The track "Romance" is a Techno version of a fragment of the 19th century classical guitar piece by the same name.

The bonus track "Lakme (Fruity Loops)" is a techno rendering of the song Flower Duet from the opera Lakme.

== Track listing ==
=== Light ===
1. "Angelique" – 4:40
2. "Blackbird" – 4:39
3. "The Gate" – 4:14
4. "First Steps" – 10:02
5. "Closer" – 2:51
6. "Our Father" – 6:50
7. "Rocky" – 3:19
8. "Sunset" – 4:47
9. "Près de Toi" (Bonus track)

=== Shade ===
1. "Quicksilver" – 5:55
2. "Resolution" – 4:33
3. "Slipstream" – 5:15
4. "Surfing" – 5:36
5. "Tears of an Angel" – 5:38
6. "Romance" – 4:00
7. "Ringscape" – 4:22
8. "Nightshade" – 5:11
9. "Lakme (Fruity Loops)" (Bonus track)
10. "Cook's Tune" (Bonus track)

== U-MYX CD-ROM tracks ==
- "Quicksilver" (U-MYX version)
- "Our Father" (U-MYX version)
- "Slipstream" (U-MYX version)
- "Angelique" (U-MYX version)

== Equipment list ==
=== Guitars ===
- Fender Stratocaster (pink) 1963
- Paul Reed Smith Signature 1990
- Ramírez Classical 1974
- Fender Precision Bass 1964

=== Piano ===
- Steinway & Sons Grand 1928

=== Keyboards ===
- Roland
- Yamaha

=== Computers ===
- Power Mac G5 (Logic 7)
- PC (Windows XP Pro with FL Studio)

=== Software plugins ===
- Glaresoft: iDrum
- Linplug: Albino 2
- Native Instruments: Absynth 3 / Altered States / FM7 / Morphology / Reaktor / Sounds of Polynesia / Wired
- reFX: Vanguard
- Spectrasonics: Atmosphere / Stylus RMX
- Steinberg: Groove Agent / Hypersonic / Kantos / Slayer / XPhrase
- Virtual Vocalist Software: Vocaloid / Cantor

== Single ==
The "Surfing" single

One of the Vocaloid tracks, "Surfing", was meant to be the album's first single, according to the Spanish website zm.nu. A promo single was released on 3 September 2005.

== Use in other media ==
Pieces from Light and Shade have been used in media, such as the use of "Resolution" and "Slipstream" in the BBC's technology series Click.
