= Listen Here =

Listen Here may refer to:

- Listen Here (Freddie McCoy album)
- Listen Here (Jasmine Rae album)
- Listen Here (Roseanna Vitro album)
- Listen Here! (Eddie Palmieri album)
- Listen Here! (sampler album), a sampler album released by Transatlantic Records
