= Thou Art in Heaven =

Single by Mike Oldfield

from the album Tres Lunas
- Released: 26 August 2002
- Genre: Chillout
- Length: 3:44
- Label: Warner Music Spain
- Songwriter: Mike Oldfield
- Producer: Mike Oldfield

Mike Oldfield singles chronology
"To Be Free" (2002)	"Thou Art in Heaven" (2002)	"Introduction 2003" (2003)

"Thou Art in Heaven" is a single by musician Mike Oldfield, released in 2002.

It is from the album Tres Lunas. "Thou Art in Heaven" is a cut-down version of the 13-minute "Art in Heaven", which featured on The Art in Heaven Concert, live in Berlin on Millennium night. Unlike the full "Art in Heaven", "Thou Art in Heaven" does not include "Ode to Joy" from Ludwig van Beethoven's Ninth Symphony.

Some of the additional tracks on the CD include various language versions of Oldfield's previous single, "To Be Free", also from the Tres Lunas album.

== Track listing ==
=== The Remixes CD ===
All songs written by Mike Oldfield.

1. "Thou Art in Heaven" (Radio edit)
2. "Thou Art in Heaven" (Pumpin' Dolls Vs. Mighty Mike Club Mix) (Radio Edit)
3. "Thou Art in Heaven" (Soultronik-Stethoscope) (Radio Edit)
4. "Thou Art in Heaven" (Pumpin' Dolls Vs. Mighty Mike Club Mix)
5. "Thou Art in Heaven" (Soultronik-Stethoscope)
6. "To Be Free" (Spanish version) (Radio edit)
7. "To Be Free" (French version) (Radio edit)
8. "To Be Free" (German version) (Radio edit)

== Charts ==
Chart (2002)	Peak position
Hungary (Single Top 40)	18
