= Tres Lunas =

Studio album by Mike Oldfield
- Released: 3 June 2002
- Recorded: Oldfield's home studio at Roughwood Croft, Chalfont St. Giles and Plan 1 Studios, Munich
- Genres: Chill-out, new-age
- Length: 58:19
- Label: Warner Music Spain
- Producer: Mike Oldfield

Mike Oldfield chronology
The Millennium Bell (1999)	Tres Lunas (2002)	Tubular Bells 2003 (2003)

Singles from Tres Lunas
- 1. "To Be Free" Released: 20 May 2002; 2. "Thou Art in Heaven" Released: 26 August 2002

Professional ratings
Review scores
Source	Rating
Allmusic	3/5 stars

Tres Lunas, stylized as Tr3s Lunas, is the twenty-first studio album by English musician and songwriter Mike Oldfield, released in June 2002 by Warner Music Spain. After his previous album The Millennium Bell (1999), Oldfield started work on his first release for MusicVR, a musical virtual reality project with simulator computer game elements and music. The idea developed to have the Tres Lunas MusicVR feature included as part of an album package, for which Oldfield wrote and recorded new music and signed with Warner Music Spain. Tres Lunas saw Oldfield explore electronic and chill-out music.

== Production ==
=== Title ===
When translated from the Spanish language to English, the album name Tres Lunas is Three Moons. This is reflected in the typeface on the album cover, with the letter 'e' being replaced with a numeric '3'. Oldfield stated that the title was inspired by an Italian restaurant in Ibiza (where he was living at the time) called Las Dos Lunas, which uses two mirrored C-shaped moons as a logo – as well as by the fact that the Tres Lunas game, which he created simultaneously with the music, features three moons within its landscape. The cover is from an original idea by Hans Claesson of Kebawe.

=== Recording ===
Oldfield's sister, Sally makes a speaking appearance on this album. The previous Mike Oldfield album which she had appeared on being 1978's Incantations. The main vocalist for "To Be Free" is the Jazz singer Jude Sim. British-Asian vocalist called Amar, who first appeared on Tubular Bells III, also contributes vocals to the album. The album was recorded at Oldfield's Roughwood Studios, with additional parts recorded at Plan 1 Studios, Munich.

The saxophone sound is played with the use of a guitar synthesizer.

== Computer game ==
Tres Lunas was the vehicle for Oldfield's first publicly released MusicVR game. It was followed by Maestro. Some of the music from the Tres Lunas game eventually ended up on Oldfield's Light + Shade album.

Oldfield had been working on the idea of melding virtual reality and music throughout the 1990s. Oldfield worked with 3D graphics programmer Colin Dooley and graphic artist Nick Catcheside. The Newlook and Modelworks software packages were used in the creation of the game. Modelworks was used to create the 3D models and Newlook is the game engine, level editor and music sequencer used to create the final game. Both software packages were written by Colin Dooley with Newlook being created specifically for the Music VR project.

2002 saw the release of Oldfield's first new album of the Millennium, entitled Tres Lunas. This was also the first publicly released MusicVR game, also titled Tres Lunas. A demo version of the game came on a second CD packaged with the album, with the full version available for purchase from Oldfield's website. The game has since become available for free. The game featured segments of music from the album Tres Lunas, along with specially composed music. In the game players can fly around the world, collecting a maximum of 7 gold rings, which change the music played. Players can also study or manipulate many objects, with various consequences.

By the time of the first release, Oldfield had also expressed the desire for people to share their game with others, and thus the game became a multiplayer game, with people connecting to the game world via the Internet. Each person could have their own avatar, which they would use to fly around the virtual worlds. A maximum of 13 avatars can be in use at any one time, with others being observers, all having the ability to chat. Oldfield would log in from time to time in order to chat with his fans live. Oldfield was interviewed about the game and his faith on The Heaven and Earth Show on BBC One.

== Track listing ==
1. "Misty" – 3:59
2. "No Mans Land" – 6:08
3. "Return to the Origin" – 4:38
4. "Landfall" – 2:19
5. "Viper" – 4:32
6. "Turtle Island" – 3:40
7. "To Be Free" – 4:21
8. "Fire Fly" – 3:46
9. "Tres Lunas" – 4:35
10. "Daydream" – 2:15
11. "Thou Art in Heaven" – 5:22
12. "Sirius" – 5:47
13. "No Mans Land" (Reprise) – 2:56
14. "To Be Free" (Radio edit) (Bonus track) – 3:56

== Personnel ==
- Mike Oldfield
- Sally Oldfield – Spoken voice
- Jude Sim – Vocals on "To Be Free"
- Amar – Vocals
- Ben Darlow – Assistant engineer
- Philip Lewis – Percussion programming (assistant at Plan 1)
- Thomas Süssmair – Percussion programming (assistant at Plan 1)

== Charts ==
Chart performance for Tres Lunas
Chart (2002)	Peak position
Hungarian Albums (MAHASZ)	9

== Certifications ==
Region	Certification	Certified units/sales
Spain (Promusicae)	Platinum	100,000^{^}
^{^} Shipments figures based on certification alone.
