= Spheres (instrumental) =

Single by Mike Oldfield

from the album Music of the Spheres
- Released: 3 March 2008
- Genre: Classical, new age, electronic
- Length: 5:22
- Label: Universal Classics and Jazz; Mercury Records
- Songwriter: Mike Oldfield
- Producer: Mike Oldfield

Mike Oldfield singles chronology
"Surfing" (2005)	"Spheres" (2008)	"Sailing" (2014)

"Spheres" is a classical digital-only single by Mike Oldfield from his album Music of the Spheres released on 3 March 2008.

== Demo version ==
The track "Spheres" is an early demo from the conception of Music of the Spheres and thus has no input from others, such as Karl Jenkins. It contains parts of the tracks "Harbinger" and "Shabda" from the album. The track is largely recorded using synthesized instruments, which were not used in the final album in favour of a full orchestra.

== Charts ==
At the week ending 9 March 2008, "Spheres" was #1 on the 7digital Track Chart.

== Track listing ==
1. "Spheres" – 5:22
