= Mirrors (Sally Oldfield song) =

Single by Sally Oldfield

from the album Water Bearer
- Released: 1978
- Genre: Folk pop; psychedelic pop; lounge
- Length: 3:17
- Label: Bronze
- Songwriter(s): Oldfield
- Producer(s): Oldfield

Sally Oldfield singles chronology
"Mirrors" (1978)	"The Sun in my Eyes" (1979)

"Mirrors" is a song by the English recording artist Sally Oldfield from her debut studio album, Water Bearer (1978). It was released by Bronze Records as the lead single from the album, and it later reached #19 in the UK charts.

== Background and composition ==
Oldfield wrote "Mirrors" after becoming frustrated with Bronze Records over a request for her to write a new song for Water Bearer, which was soon to be released. The label had at one point, according to Oldfield, even suggested 'something with a trumpet intro'. In an interview with Teamrock.com, she commented that as she suddenly thought of an idea that would become the song while driving home, she 'was so happy that [she] bounced up and down'.

The song features instrumentation resembling lounge music and exotica, with prominent bongos, uncharacteristic for styles of pop music that had been increasing in popularity at the time. Oldfield's two performances of "Mirrors" on the BBC music show Top of the Pops made it more obvious that it differed from other hit singles; "I don't think the audience knew how to react to me in my hippy dress, or the song, so, I wouldn't say I was ever regarded as a pop star by anyone, least of all myself."
