= To Be Free (Mike Oldfield song) =

Mike Oldfield's musical single

Single by Mike Oldfield

from the album Tres Lunas
- Released: 20 May 2002
- Genre: Chillout, pop
- Length: 3:59
- Label: Warner Music Spain
- Songwriter: Mike Oldfield
- Producers: Mike Oldfield; Jose Luis Adelantado, Paco Carro & Luis Mompo (Soultronik mixes); Juan Belmonte & Abel Arana (Pumpin' Dolls mixes)

Mike Oldfield singles chronology
"The X-Files Theme" (1998)	"To Be Free" (2002)	"Thou Art in Heaven" (2002)

Belgium cover

"To Be Free" is a single by musician Mike Oldfield, released in 2002. It is from the album Tres Lunas released by Warner Music. The main vocalist is the Jazz singer Jude Sim.

== Track listing ==
All songs by Mike Oldfield.

=== The Remixes CD ===
1. "To Be Free" (Single version)
2. "To Be Free" (Pumpin' Dolls to the Top Club Mix)
3. "To Be Free" (Pumpin' Dolls Argento Dub Mix)
4. "To Be Free" (Soultronik Hard Floor Cibervetido Mix)
5. "To Be Free" (Soultronik Mix - Tical Mix)

=== Belgium single ===
1. "To Be Free" (Pumpin' Dolls Radio Friendly Edit) (3:23)
2. "To Be Free" (Radio edit) (3:59)

== Charts ==
Chart (2002)	Peak position
Hungary (Single Top 40)	2
