= Music of the Spheres (Mike Oldfield album) =

Studio album by Mike Oldfield
- Released: 14 March 2008
- Recorded: Abbey Road Studios, Studio 1, June 2007
- Genre: Classical
- Length: 45:30
- Label: Universal Classics and Jazz; Mercury
- Producer: Mike Oldfield; Karl Jenkins

Mike Oldfield chronology
Light + Shade (2005)	Music of the Spheres (2008)	Man on the Rocks (2014)

Singles from Music of the Spheres
- 1. "Spheres" Released: 3 March 2008

Professional ratings
Review scores
Source	Rating
Allmusic	4/5 stars
IM	4/5 stars

Music of the Spheres is the 24th album by English musician Mike Oldfield, released in the United Kingdom on 17 March 2008. The album, Oldfield's second album with Mercury Records and his first classical work, is based on the concept of a celestial Musica universalis.

The album features New Zealand soprano Hayley Westenra (on "On My Heart") and Chinese pianist Lang Lang on six tracks.

Music of the Spheres was nominated for a Classical Brit Award in 2009.

== History ==
In an interview on BBC Radio 2's Steve Wright show, broadcast 23 February 2006, Oldfield elaborated on his next project, saying he was working on a long instrumental – probably in three parts and without any drum loops. He also mentioned the possibility of a tour. In an interview for the March 2007 issue of Resolution Magazine, Oldfield added that it would be a classical album "going to be based around the festival of Hallowe’en, rather than the Hollywood horror film", in which he would only play "classical guitar and grand piano". In an interview with This is London, Oldfield revealed the name of the new album as Music of the Spheres.

=== Recording ===
Initially the album was written with electronic elements, like his last album, Light & Shade, but as the album developed it became an orchestral piece. The single "Spheres" is from the early stages of the album. Oldfield wrote much of the music in the music notation software Sibelius on an Apple Macintosh. Oldfield noted in the computing magazine MacFormat that creating the orchestral score for the album was time-consuming, as the MIDI timing and velocities varied too much.

On the ITV This Morning show, while promoting his autobiography, Changeling, Oldfield stated that he would be recording the album with Karl Jenkins and a full orchestra at Abbey Road Studios in early June 2007; nine months before the final release date. In an interview with British radio station Classic FM on 10 August 2007, Oldfield noted that Lang Lang had recorded his piano pieces over a webcam from Legacy Recording Studios, New York City using iChat and a Steinway piano.

=== Release ===
The album had been delayed a number of times, for various reasons. Originally, the release was aimed for Halloween; this was later pushed back to November 2007. In September 2007, Oldfield and Universal decided to delay the release of the album until January 2008, for personal reasons. However, in November the release date was again put back until March 2008, around this time Oldfield also moved out of the United Kingdom to Spain. It was also going to be the first classical recording released on a USB flash drive, but ultimately it was only made available on CD and Online. On iTunes the album has bonus material and there was also a promotion at HMV.co.uk; a competition with a prize of the full annotated orchestral score used during the recordings. 200 randomly selected copies from Play.com were also signed by Mike Oldfield. A 2 CD Limited Edition version including both the studio and live recordings was released on 24 November 2008.

On 18 September 2007, Universal, the record label, held a presentation event, hosted by Yellow Lounge at the Tape Club in Berlin; Oldfield was not scheduled to be present, but he appeared for 5 minutes to answer questions. There was also a promotional release, packaged in a tin. It includes a heat sensitive mug mat, shaped insert brochure, and an Electronic Press Kit disc featuring 2 video clips.

In November 2007 Universal included "On My Heart" (featuring Hayley Westenra) on their No 1 Classical Album 2008 compilation album. Westenra and Oldfield performed "On My Heart" live on the ITV daytime program The Alan Titchmarsh Show on 18 March 2008. During the week beginning the 10 March, Music of the Spheres was the featured album on the Classic FM radio station.

=== Live at Bilbao ===
A second press event was scheduled at the Guggenheim Museum in Bilbao on 7 March 2008; as part of the launch event Oldfield performed music from Music of the Spheres live with the Euskadiko Orkestra Sinfonikoa, the Bilbao Choral Society and Hayley Westenra. The concert was recorded and was originally released exclusively on Apple's iTunes on the same day as the album, with modified artwork, EPK videos and a PDF booklet. A 2 CD version of the album was released on 24 November 2008 in a digipack.

== Critical reception ==
Music of the Spheres was nominated for a Classical BRIT award, the NS&I Best Album of 2009, but lost out to Royal Scots Dragoon Guards' Spirit of the Glen–Journey.

== Chart performance ==
Music of the Spheres entered the UK Classical charts at number 1, as published by Music Week. It also entered the UK Albums Chart at number 9, making it the most successful Oldfield album of the 2000s. Also, according to Music Week, as of October, Music of the Spheres is the 2nd best selling classical album of 2008.

Music of the Spheres is certificated Silver in UK.

=== Charts ===
Chart (2008)	Peak position
Austrian Albums (Ö3 Austria)	62
Belgian Albums (Ultratop Wallonia)	96
Danish Albums (Hitlisten)	24
French Albums (SNEP)	72
German Albums (Offizielle Top 100)	14
Greek Album Chart	23
Hungarian Albums (MAHASZ)	13
Irish Albums (IRMA)	87
Irish Classical Album Chart	2
Italian Albums (FIMI)	49
Polish Albums (ZPAV)	13
Scottish Albums (OCC)	11
Spanish Albums (PROMUSICAE)	7
Swedish Albums (Sverigetopplistan)	31
Swiss Albums (Schweizer Hitparade)	37
UK Albums (OCC)	9
UK Classical Chart	1
US Billboard Top Classical Crossover Albums	10

== Certifications ==
Region	Certification	Certified units/sales
Poland (ZPAV)	Gold	10,000^{*}
United Kingdom (BPI)	Silver	60,000^{*}
^{*} Sales figures based on certification alone.

== Track listing ==
=== Standard studio version ===
All tracks are written by Mike Oldfield.

Part one
No.	Title	Length
1.	"Harbinger"	4:08
2.	"Animus"	3:09
3.	"Silhouette"	3:19
4.	"Shabda"	4:00
5.	"The Tempest"	5:48
6.	"Harbinger (Reprise)"	1:30
7.	"On My Heart" (Featuring Hayley Westenra)	2:27

Part two
No.	Title	Length
8.	"Aurora"	3:42
9.	"Prophecy"	2:54
10.	"On My Heart (Reprise)" (Featuring Hayley Westenra)	1:16
11.	"Harmonia Mundi"	3:46
12.	"The Other Side"	1:28
13.	"Empyrean"	1:37
14.	"Musica Universalis"	6:24

=== Live from Bilbao ===
All tracks are written by Mike Oldfield.

No.	Title	Length
1.	"Harbinger"	4:09
2.	"Animus"	3:05
3.	"Silhouette"	3:19
4.	"Shabda"	4:02
5.	"The Tempest"	5:38
6.	"Harbinger (reprise)"	1:27
7.	"On My Heart"	2:26
8.	"Aurora"	3:38
9.	"Prophecy"	2:58
10.	"On My Heart (reprise)"	1:08
11.	"Harmonia Mundi"	3:10
12.	"The Other Side"	1:27
13.	"Empyrean"	1:57
14.	"Musica Universalis"	6:13
Total length:		44:36

=== iTunes-only version ===
The iTunes-only version includes Music of the Spheres, Music of the Spheres – Live from Bilbao and Interviews.

Interviews
No.	Title	Length
1.	"Mike Oldfield interview"	3:03
2.	"Karl Jenkins interview"	2:09
Total length:		5:12

== "Spheres" ==
"Spheres" is a digital-only single which was released on 3 March 2008. It is a piece from the conception stages of the album and contains parts of "Harbinger" and "Shabda". Although "Spheres" was the digital single released alongside the album, the vocal piece "On My Heart" was played in promotion of the album, such as on television show performances.

== Track meanings ==
One of the album's tracks is entitled "Musica Universalis", which when loosely translated into English is music of the spheres, an ancient philosophical concept that regards proportions in the movements of celestial bodies as a form of music; the concept of which the album is based upon. It is also, when literally translated, the name of Oldfield's current record label, Universal Music. This record company name trick is a repeat of a track title on his previous album Light & Shade: "Quicksilver", which is another name for the metal mercury; Light & Shade was released on Mercury Records, a sublabel of Universal Music.

== Personnel ==
- Mike Oldfield – Classical guitar, producer and mixer
- Hayley Westenra – vocals
- Lang Lang – piano on tracks 1, 2, 3, 5, 6 and 9.
- Karl Jenkins – orchestrations, conductor and producer
- Sinfonia Sfera Orchestra

=== Orchestra ===
The Sinfonia Sfera Orchestra are:

- Choir:
  - Mary Carewe
  - Jacqueline Barron
  - Nicole Tibbels
  - Mae McKenna
  - Heather Cairncross
  - Sarah Eyden
- 1st Violins:
  - Richard Studt (leader)
  - Judith Temppleman
  - Tom Pigott-Smith
  - Harriott McKenzie
  - Tristan Gurney
  - Jemma McCrisken
  - Amy Cardigan
  - Joanna McWeeney
  - Gillon Cameron
  - Louisa Adridge
  - Kotono Sato
  - Jeremy Morris
  - Miriam Teppich
  - Vladimir Naumov
- 2nd Violins:
  - Peter Camble-Kelly
  - Emma Parker
  - Sophie Appleton
  - Jenny Chang
  - Holly Maleham
  - David Lyon
  - Nicholas Levy
  - Joanna Watts
  - Lucy Hartley
  - Jo West
  - Sarah Carter
  - Elizabeth Neil
- Violas:
  - John Thorn
  - Rachel Robson
  - Edward Vanderspar
  - Emma Owens
  - Vincent Green
  - Olly Burton
  - Rachel Dyker
  - Sarah Chapman
  - Fay Sweet
  - Holly Butler
- Cellos:
  - Sally Pendlebury
  - Jonny Byers
  - Chris Worsey
  - Verity Harding
  - Chris Fish
  - Lucy Payne
  - Morwenna Del Mar
  - Ben Trigg
- Basses:
  - Sian Hicks
  - Hugh Sparrow
  - Jeremy Watt
  - Kylie Davis
  - Frances Casey
  - Ben Griffiths
- Flutes:
  - Gareth Davies
  - Juliette Bausor
- Oboes:
  - Roy Carter
  - Rosie Jenkins
- Clarinets:
  - Chris Richards
  - Nick Ellis
- Bassoon:
  - Steven Reay
  - Louise Chapman
- Horns:
  - Peter Francomb
  - Dave Tollington
  - Joe Walters
  - Evgeny Chebykin
- Trumpets:
  - Gareth Small
  - Edward Pascal
  - Tom Watson
- Trombone:
  - Simon Willis
  - James Adams
- Bass Trombone:
  - Rob Collinson
- Tuba:
  - Alex Kidston
- Timpani:
  - Steve Henderson
- Percussion:
  - Gary Kettel
  - Paul Clarvis
  - Sam Walton
  - Neil Percy

=== Additional personnel ===
- Miles Showell – Mastering at Metropolis Mastering, London
- Simon Rhodes – Engineer
- Rupert Christie – Assistant Producer
- Richard King – Engineer

== Uses of the piece ==
Australia's Seven Network television station used sections from the album ("Prophecy" and "On My Heart" (Reprise)) as backing music for a salute to Michael Phelps' 8 medals in the 2008 Summer Olympics in Beijing, China. They also played "Harbinger" behind the salute to a Japanese equestrian participant, who competed in the Olympic Games 44 years previously.

The album was used as background music in BBC Two's Ray Mears' Northern Wilderness programme in 2009.

Sections from Music of the Spheres have been used as backing music for Russell Ducker's Epimitheus, a 20-minute ballet piece. Corella Ballet Castilla y Leon premiered the work in 2009 in Spain, and they performed it in New York in March 2010.

== Release history ==
- (Germany) – 14 March 2008
- (United Kingdom) – 17 March 2008
- (United States) – 25 March 2008
- (United Kingdom) – 24 November 2008 (2 CD edition)
