= Fear of the Dark (Gordon Giltrap album) =

Studio album by Gordon Giltrap
- Released: 1978
- Recorded: May – August 1978
- Studio: Redan Recorders; London, England
- Genre: Folk, progressive rock
- Length: 53:59
- Label: The Electric Record Company (UK)
- Producer: Jon Miller, Rod Edwards, Roger Hand

Gordon Giltrap chronology
Perilous Journey (1977)	Fear of the Dark (1978)	The Peacock Party (1979)

Professional ratings
Review scores
Source	Rating
Allmusic	3/5 stars

Fear of the Dark is a 1978 studio album by guitarist Gordon Giltrap. The album is the last of the album trilogy that started with 1976's Visionary and continued with 1977's Perilous Journey.

It was remixed and re-released in 1998.

Iron Maiden released a similarly titled album in 1992 with drummer Nicko McBrain, who played on an earlier Giltrap album. Giltrap notes that the Iron Maiden logo uses a similar font to the "Gordon Giltrap" logo on this album.

== Track listing ==
All music composed by Gordon Giltrap; except where noted.

=== Side one ===
1. "Roots (Part One and Two)" – 6:11
2. "Nightrider" (Gordon Giltrap, Rod Edwards, Roger Hand) – 5:44
3. "Inner Dream" – 5:03
4. "Weary Eyes" (Gordon Giltrap, Rod Edwards, Roger Hand) – 4:46

=== Side two ===
1. "Fast Approaching" – 5:04
2. "Melancholy Lullaby" – 2:28
3. "Fear of the Dark" (Gordon Giltrap, Rod Edwards, Roger Hand) – 7:56
4. "Visitation" – 4:26

== Personnel ==
- Gordon Giltrap - acoustic and electric guitars, vocals
- Rod Edwards - keyboards, piano, synthesizer, string arrangements, vocals
- John G. Perry - Wal electric bass
- Simon Phillips - drums

with:

- Tony Carr - percussion
- Roger Hand - vocals; rhythm guitar on "Weary Eyes"; string arrangements, conductor
- Clive Bunker - additional drums on "Fast Approaching"
- Graham Preskett - violin
- Shirlie Roden - vocals

Technical

- Roger T. Wake - engineer
- Bob Bowkett - art direction
- Paul Kale - sleeve concept
- Ged Grimmel - artwork effects, photography
