= Chris Pyne =

British musician (1939-1995)

Christopher Norman "Chris" Pyne (14 February 1939, Bridlington, East Riding of Yorkshire, England – 12 April 1995, London) was an English jazz trombonist.

== Biography ==
Pyne was the elder brother of Mick Pyne, and played piano as a child before switching to trombone. He played with Fat John Cox (1963), Alexis Korner's Blues Incorporated (1964–65), John Stevens's Spontaneous Music Ensemble (1965–66), and the London Jazz Orchestra before beginning work with Humphrey Lyttelton in 1966, with whom he played until 1970, recording along the way with John Dankworth (1967), Ronnie Scott (1968), and Stan Tracey (1968–70). Pyne played with Mike Gibbs on and off from 1967 to 1979, and toured with Frank Sinatra's backing bands between 1970 and 1983; additionally, he was in John Taylor's sextet between 1971 and 1981.

Other associations in the 1970s include Kenny Wheeler (1969, 1973), John Surman (1970), Philly Joe Jones, Maynard Ferguson, Tony Coe (1976), Bobby Lamb, Ray Premru (1971), Ronnie Ross, Barbara Thompson, John Stevens again (1970–71), Norma Winstone (1971), Dankworth once more (1972), and Alan Cohen (1972). Pyne toured with Gordon Beck in 1982, and was in Surman's Brass Project from 1984 to 1992. Late in his life he played in Charlie Watts's big band.

He died in London in April 1995, at the age of 56.

== Discography ==
=== As sideman ===
With Michael Gibbs

- Michael Gibbs (Deram, 1970)
- Tanglewood 63 (Deram, 1971)
- Just Ahead (Polydor, 1972)
- Directs the Only Chrome-Waterfall Orchestra (Bronze, 1975)

With Stan Tracey

- We Love You Madly (Columbia, 1969)
- Genesis (Steam, 1987)
- We Still Love You Madly (Mole Jazz, 1989)

With Kenny Wheeler

- Windmill Tilter (Fontana, 1969)
- Song for Someone (Incus, 1973)
- Music for Large & Small Ensembles (ECM, 1990)
- Kayak (Ah Um, 1992)

With others

- Mike de Albuquerque, We May Be Cattle but We've All Got Names (RCA Victor, 1973)
- Jon Anderson, Animation (Polydor, 1982)
- Miquel Brown, Symphony of Love (Polydor, 1978)
- Sam Brown, Stop! (A&M, 1988)
- Caravan, For Girls Who Grow Plump in the Night (Deram, 1973)
- Hoagy Carmichael, Georgie Fame, Annie Ross, In Hoagland (Bald Eagle 1981)
- Karen Cheryl, Karen Cheryl (Ibach, 1978)
- Tony Coe, Zeitgeist: Based on Poems of Jill Robin (EMI, 1977)
- Curved Air, Phantasmagoria (Warner Bros., 1972)
- Delegation, Eau De Vie (Ariola, 1979)
- Bob Downes, Open Music (Philips, 1970)
- Elf, Carolina County Ball (Purple, 1974)
- Everything but the Girl, Baby, the Stars Shine Bright (Blanco y Negro, 1986)
- Georgie Fame, Seventh Son (CBS, 1969)
- Maynard Ferguson, M.F. Horn (Columbia, 1970)
- Bryan Ferry, Another Time, Another Place (Island, 1974)
- Albert Finney, Albert Finney's Album (Motown, 1977)
- Gordon Giltrap, Visionary (Electric, 1976)
- Gordon Giltrap, Perilous Journey (Electric, 1977)
- The Goodies, Nothing to Do with Us (Island, 1976)
- Tubby Hayes, 200% Proof (Master Mix 1992)
- Elton John, Ice on Fire (1985)
- Philly Joe Jones, Trailways Express (Black Lion, 1971)
- Salena Jones, Platinum (CBS, 1971)
- Eartha Kitt, I'm Still Here (Arista, 1989)
- Alexis Korner, Sky High (Spot, 1966)
- Alexis Korner, Bootleg Him! (Warner Bros., 1972)
- Malcolm and Alwyn, Wildwall (Key, 1974)
- Manfred Mann Chapter Three, Manfred Mann Chapter Three (Vertigo, 1970)
- Paul McCartney, Give My Regards to Broad Street (Parlophone, 1984)
- Nektar, Down to Earth (Bellaphon, 1974)
- The Nice, Five Bridges (Charisma, 1970)
- Alan Price, Metropolitan Man (Polydor, 1975)
- Ronnie Scott, Live at Ronnie Scott's (CBS, 1968)
- Jack Sharpe, Roarin (1989)
- Peter Sinfield, Still (Manticore, 1973)
- Spontaneous Music Ensemble, The Source: From and Towards (Tangent, 1971)
- Spontaneous Music Ensemble, Live Big Band and Quartet (Vinyl, 1979)
- John Surman, How Many Clouds Can You See? (Deram, 1970)
- John Surman, The Brass Project (ECM, 1993)
- John Taylor, Pause, and Think Again (Turtle, 1971)
- Top Topham, Ascension Heights (Blue Horizon, 1970)
- Jasper Van't Hof, George Gruntz, Fairytale (MPS, 1979)
- Loudon Wainwright III, I'm Alright (Rounder, 1985)
- Charlie Watts, Live at Fulham Town Hall (CBS, 1986)
- Norma Winstone, Edge of Time (Argo, 1972)
