= Tubular Bells 2003 =

Studio album by Mike Oldfield
- Released: 26 May 2003
- Recorded: August 2002–February 2003
- Studio: Oldfield's home studio at Roughwood Croft, Chalfont St Giles, Buckinghamshire
- Genre: Progressive rock
- Length: 48:38
- Label: Warner Music Spain
- Producer: Mike Oldfield

Mike Oldfield chronology
Tres Lunas (2002)	Tubular Bells 2003 (2003)	Light + Shade (2005)

Tubular Bells series chronology
The Complete Tubular Bells (2003)	Tubular Bells 2003 (2003)

Singles from Tubular Bells 2003
- 1. "Introduction 2003" Released: 24 April 2003

Professional ratings
Review scores
Source	Rating
AllMusic	4/5 stars

Tubular Bells 2003 is the 22nd studio album by English musician Mike Oldfield, released on 26 May 2003 by Warner Music Spain. It is a digital re-recording of his 1973 album Tubular Bells, released almost 30 years earlier. This is the final album in the Tubular Bells series.

== Background ==
After the re-recording rights to Oldfield's debut album Tubular Bells had returned to him, he got the idea to re-record it to commemorate the 30th anniversary of the original. He had always been uncomfortable with the original recording because he had only had a few weeks to record it and the technology at the time had been unable to cope with all of his requirements. As a result, mistakes could not be fixed and some instruments were out of tune on the 1973 release. Due to contractual reasons, no re-recordings were allowed for 25 years after the original release. The release of Tubular Bells 2003 took place in the year when Oldfield celebrated his 50th birthday and the 30th anniversary of the original version.

To remain faithful to the original album, Oldfield obtained a copy of the original 16 track tape, from Richard Barrie of AIR Studios; this multitrack was then recorded into Digidesign Pro Tools. There were a few parts of the multitrack recording missing, however; this included parts of the "Finale", "Caveman" and "The Sailors Hornpipe" sections. These original tracks were then moved into Emagic Logic, where Oldfield used MIDI to create a tempo and time signature map; some sections of the original album had not been in time. A guide MIDI keyboard was laid on top, for which Oldfield usually used some Roland Strings. The first instrument to be recorded was the glockenspiel at the beginning of the "Introduction" of Part One, and the final part to be recorded was the "Caveman" vocal track.

The album was released in four versions: a CD in Europe, a CD in North America, and a DVD-Audio edition. The copy protection on the CDs caused many complaints about playback difficulties, including claims of damage to CD and DVD players.

Due to the extensive use of digital technology, Tubular Bells 2003 has a more synthesised and brighter sound than the original. Because of the death of Vivian Stanshall, who was the original master of ceremonies on the 1973 release, Oldfield had actor John Cleese introduce the instruments in the "Finale" part.

A CD audio/DVD Video-audio 5.1 was released in Spain and México.

There is a facetious warning inside the cover of the CD: "This stereo record can still not be played on old tin boxes no matter what they are fitted with. If you are in possession of such equipment please hand it into the nearest police station." This warning references a similar note, without the word "still", from the original album.

=== Promo single ===
"Introduction 2003" promo single.

A video and Spanish promo single were produced for a remix version of the Tubular Bells "Introduction" theme, entitled "Introduction 2003". Released as a single in Spain on 24 April 2003, it features drums and more synthesized instruments, and a conceptual video was also produced. This video is available on the DVD Audio version of Tubular Bells 2003.

The second publicly released MusicVR game, Maestro, used various extracts from Tubular Bells 2003.

== Personnel ==
Performers

- Mike Oldfield – acoustic and electric guitars, electric bass, accordion, Steinway grand pianos, Farfisa, Lowrey & Hammond organs, synthesizers, glockenspiel, timpani, cymbals, tambourine, triangle, tubular bells, programming, producer
- John Cleese – master of ceremonies
- Sally Oldfield – background vocals

Non-performers

- Ben Darlow – engineer
- Steve Bedford – new Tubular Bell image
- Trevor Key – original Tubular Bell image
- Andy Earl – inner cover photo
- e-xentric thinking – design
- Oldfield Music Overseas Ltd. / EMI Publishing Ltd – publishing

== Track listing ==
=== CD ===
Part one

1. "Introduction" – 5:52
2. "Fast Guitars" – 1:04
3. "Basses" – 0:46
4. "Latin" – 2:18
5. "A Minor Tune" – 1:21
6. "Blues" – 2:40
7. "Thrash" – 0:44
8. "Jazz" – 0:48
9. "Ghost Bells" – 0:30
10. "Russian" – 0:44
11. "Finale" – 8:32 (featuring John Cleese)

Part two

12. "Harmonics" – 5:12
13. "Peace" – 3:30
14. "Bagpipe Guitars" – 3:08
15. "Caveman" – 4:33
16. "Ambient Guitars" – 5:10
17. "The Sailor's Hornpipe" – 1:46 (Traditional arrangement)

=== Bonus DVD ===
- Disc 2 – Total Time 11:22
1. "Introduction" – 5:51
2. "Fast Guitars" – 1:04
3. "Basses" – 0:46
4. "Introduction 2003" 'The video' – 3:41

=== DVD-Audio bonus material ===
The DVD-Audio edition includes the demos Oldfield recorded in his flat in 1971 and two excerpts from other Oldfield DVD releases.

1971 demos

1. "Tubular Bells Long" – 22:57
2. "Caveman Lead-In" – 2:46
3. "Caveman" – 5:05
4. "Peace Demo A" – 7:00
5. "Peace Demo B" – 4:18

Live excerpts

1. "Sentinel" – from Tubular Bells II – Live at Edinburgh Castle 1992 – 8:06
2. "Far Above the Clouds" – from Tubular Bells III – Live at Horseguards Parade, London 1998 – 4:40

== Equipment ==
=== Hardware ===
Mixing desk

- AMS Neve Capricorn (V2.85.003 & V2.91.007)

Computers

- Apple Macintosh computers
  - G4 466Mhz OS9.1, 1Gb Ram – Logic Audio Platinum 4.8.1 and Pro Tools
  - G4 1000Mhz OS9.2 – Logic 5.3.0 and Pro Tools 5.3.1
  - Powerbook 5300
- Pro Tools Mix Plus card X2
- 4 Pro Tools 24-bit 888s
- Motu 828

Plug-ins

- Amp Farm
- Focusrite EQ and Compression

Outboard effects

- TC Electronic M5000
- Eventide DSP 4000
- Lexicon 300
- Yamaha SPX 1000
- UREI 1176 & 1178
- Belcaman C-102
- 5 NEVE 1073 Mic Amps and EQ
- Manor Module (Mic Amp, EQ and Compressor from the original Manor console)

Microphones

- Brüel & Kjær 4011
- Brüel & Kjær 4040 (Serial no. 001)
- AKG C12
- Shure SM57
- Neuman U67
- Neuman M249
- Beyer Dynamic M160
- BSS DI Box

=== Instruments ===
Electric guitars

- Fender Telecaster 1965
- Fender Stratocaster 1963 (listed as 1965) (Pink)
- PRS McCarty Semi-Acoustic
- PRS Signature (through Roland GP8)
- PRS Signature (through Roland VG8)
- Wal bass
- Fender Twin Reverb Amplifier
- Mesa Boogie Amplifier

Acoustic guitars

- Ramirez Class 1A Flamenco 1974
- Ramirez Class 1A Flamenco 1975
- Martin Steel String Acoustic
- Taylor K22 Acoustic Guitar 1985
- Ovation Adamas
- MJV Mandolin

Pianos and organs

- Steinway 8 ft 1920s, frame rebuilt
- Steinway 6 ft 1920s Model L
- Lowery Organ
- Farfisa Organ
- Accordion

Keyboards

- Roland JV880
- Roland XP50
- Roland JV2080
- Roland JD990
- Nord Lead
- Korg Trinity
- Boss Dr. Rhythm
- Akai S6000

Soft synths

- Emagic EXS24
- Emagic ES1
- Emagic EVP88
- Native Instruments Pro-52

Percussion

- Glockenspiel
- Tambourine
- Triangle
- Cymbals
- Timpani
- Tubular bells

== Charts ==
2003 chart performance for Tubular Bells 2003
Chart (2003)	Peak position
Dutch Albums (Album Top 100)	41
French Albums (SNEP)	44
German Albums (Offizielle Top 100)	29
Spanish Albums (PROMUSICAE)	11
Swiss Albums (Schweizer Hitparade)	55
UK Albums (Official Charts)	51

2025 chart performance for Tubular Bells 2003
Chart (2025)	Peak position
Hungarian Albums (MAHASZ)	22

== Release details ==
Release history for Tubular Bells 2003
Year	Country	Label	Catalogue number	Release date	Format	Copy protected	Other discs
2003	UK	WEA/Warner Bros.	2564602042	26 May 2003	CD	Yes	
2003	UK	WEA/Warner Bros.	0927499212	26 May 2003	CD	Yes	Bonus DVD
2003	UK	WEA/Warner Bros.	2564602052	26 May 2003	CD	Yes, TB2003 only	TB II, TB III and a Bonus DVD (4 disc box)
2003	USA	Rhino	?	5 August 2003	CD	No	
2003	UK	WEA/Warner Bros.	?	5 August 2003	CD	No	
2004	UK	WEA/Warner Bros.	2564602045	26 January 2004	DVD Audio	N/A	
2004	United States	Rhino	I454715	24 February 2004	DVD Audio	N/A	
2025	Spain	WEA/Warner Bros.	502173251589	23 May 2025	LP	N/A	
