= Maestro (2004 video game) =

2004 video game

- Developer: Mike Oldfield
- Designer: Mike Oldfield
- Series: MusicVR
- Platform: Windows
- Release: 12 April 2004
- Genres: Simulation, Music game, Art game
- Modes: Single player, multiplayer

Maestro is a MusicVR video game by British musician Mike Oldfield. It is the second publicly released MusicVR game after 2002's Tres Lunas.

== History ==
Oldfield had been working on the idea of melding virtual reality and music throughout the 1990s. The first publicly released MusicVR game was called Tres Lunas.

In 2003 Oldfield had rerecorded his first album, Tubular Bells, as Tubular Bells 2003. This was to become the musical inspiration for the second MusicVR game, initially titled The Tube World. The final title became Maestro in 2004 and once again it was available for purchase on his website, and since has become available for free. The game featured segments of music from the classic Tubular Bells, along with new music composed specifically for the game. In the game there are 24 medals and 4 'gravitars' to find. The original price was £14.98 for the download and £18 for the CD.

Both games are available for free download from the archive page of an Oldfield fansite Tubular.net.

== See also ==
- MusicVR
- Tres Lunas (video game)
