= Cantor (music software) =

Vocal synthesizer plugin

- Cantor 2.1 interface
- Developer(s): VirSyn
- Initial release: July 2004; 20 years ago
- Stable release: 2.1 / February 6, 2007; 18 years ago
- Operating system: Windows XP and later, OS X 10.5 or later
- Available in: English, German
- Type: Musical synthesizer application
- Website: virsyn.com/en/E_Home/e_home.html

Cantor was a vocal singing synthesizer software released four months after the original release of Vocaloid by the company VirSyn, and was based on the same idea of synthesizing the human voice. VirSyn released English and German versions of this software. Cantor 2 boasted a variety of voices from near-realistic sounding ones to highly expressive vocals and robotic voices.

== Technology ==
Cantor was not based on singing samples, and its results were reproduced by a morphing additive synthesis engine derived from VirSyn's Cube software synthesizer. It is used to generate the 39 phonemes that VirSyn used to reproduce English speech or singing. Each phoneme is created by passing an additive sound source through a formant filter, which morphs between a start and an end state. These filter responses are fully editable: Up to six peaks and three troughs in the formant filter response can be specified as morph points. Cantor 2 offered 20 ready-to-use vocals in English and German and added many new voices on top of the original Cantor software, bringing the total to 50 voices.

The sound generator used a combination of additive synthesis and noise sculpting that it used specifically for the 50 voiced sounds provided by the software as set as a complete set for the unvoiced sounds. The concept of voiced and unvoiced sounds was complicated but was used to describe how Cantor was able to master its language capabilities of human speech. For voiced sounds, the additive synth controls the pitched component of the sound (vocal cords), whereas the noise synth controls the breath component (whisper). It controlled up to 256 partials. As the user went higher into the octaves, these became grouped for control. For those who had used other VirSyn's software, Cantor was familiar grounds and bore many things in common with past synthesizers VirSyn had produced.

Because of its design, it was more like a virtual instrument than a virtual singer. It never claimed to mimic a real singer's voice and was intended purely for special effects. Although it was complex, Cantor was considered a simple design overall and relatively easy to use for its purposes.

It hosted VST, AU and RTAS capabilities. By Cantor 2's release, midi file format was fully functional. It was able to work as a standalone software or as a plugin; there were slight differences between the software for both. It worked as a standalone software or plug-in and supported ReWire. Though it was released in German and English, with adjustments of the sound output it was possible to recreate vocal languages beyond this and mimic other languages.

== History ==
Cantor was released after the original Vocaloid engine and was considered a suitable software to rival Yamaha's Vocaloid engine, then only known in the western hemisphere by the Vocaloids 'Leon', 'Lola' and 'Miriam'. Cantor reached a level of vocal synthesising that had not yet been reached.

A demo of the software was released. It required purchasing an elicence dongle to download the demo, as well as the full software if it was purchased electronically. The final version, Cantor 2.1 was released on February 6, 2007. Even though updates ceased, the software was never removed from sale.

The album Light + Shade by Mike Oldfield featured both the Vocaloid 'Lola' singing alongside the Cantor software, as well as Mike himself, in the song "Surfing".

Despite being a rival program to Vocaloid, it was able to be purchased on Crypton Future Media's website.

== Reception ==
For the capabilities of what the software could do, the Cantor software was dubbed "the future of music." At the time of its release, Cantor 2 was considered ground breaking technology. Despite its capabilities, one of its let-downs was considered the high price for its contents in comparison to other software. The biggest criticism toward the software itself was its unintelligible results despite being a powerful tool and though improvements were made between Cantor and Cantor 2. It still lacked clarity which put it at a disadvantage against the more realistic sound of Vocaloid. The simple design of its interface despite the complexity of its capabilities was highly praised overall by reviewers.

Cantor was able to create a playground for experimental vocal sounds and give composers a tool for high levels of vocal affects and sounds. However, Cantor and Vocaloid were based on the same concepts and ideas; they shared a number of similar designs. It was unable to escape comparisons between itself and Vocaloid, although some musicians used both software at the time.

== See also ==
- List of music software
