= The Sallyangie =

British folk duo

- Also known as: The Sally Angie
- Origin: England
- Genres: Folk
- Years active: 1968–1969
- Labels: Transatlantic Records
- Past members: Mike Oldfield; Sally Oldfield

The Sallyangie was a 1960s folk duo consisting of siblings, Mike and Sally Oldfield. In 1968, they released their first and only album Children of the Sun. The duo split in late 1969 after limited success and a national tour. Both members have released albums since to greater success.

The duo's name is reputed to be an amalgamation of "Sally" (Oldfield's name) and "Angie", the name of a guitar instrumental, written by Davey Graham.

The duo's second single, "Child of Allah" was released three years after they had split up, a song which subsequently ended up on Sally Oldfield's debut solo album, Water Bearer in 1978.

== Discography ==
Album

- 1968 — Children of the Sun (Transatlantic Records TRA 176)

Singles

- August 1969 — "Two Ships" b/w "Colours of the World" (Big T / Transatlantic Records BIG 126)
- December 1972 — "Child of Allah" b/w "Lady Go Lightly" (Philips Records 6006 259)
