= As It Happens... =

Live album by Gordon Giltrap
- Released: 2009
- Recorded: January 27, 2007
- Venue: Dorchester Arts Centre
- Genre: Folk, Acoustic
- Label: Voiceprint (2009) (UK)
- Producer: Gordon Giltrap

Gordon Giltrap chronology
Secret Valentine (2007)	As It Happens... (2009)	From Brush and Stone (2009)

Professional ratings
Review scores
Source	Rating
Allmusic	(not rated)

As It Happens... is a 2009 live album by guitarist Gordon Giltrap.

Recorded Live at Dorchester Arts Centre on 27 January 2007, As It Happens... is the first fully complete live album by Gordon Giltrap featuring all the music and talking uncut.

== Track listing ==
All tracks composed by Gordon Giltrap; except where noted.

=== Disc One ===
1. "Maddie Goes West"
2. "Appalachian Dreaming"
3. "5 Dollar Guitar"
4. "God Save the Queen / Smoke on the Water" (Traditional / Ian Gillan, Roger Glover, Jon Lord, Ian Paice, Ritchie Blackmore)
5. "Here Comes the Sun" (George Harrison)
6. "Isabella's Wedding"
7. "At Giltrap's Bar"
8. "The Dodo's Dream"
9. "Rainbow Kites"

=== Disc Two ===
1. "Tears of Joy"
2. "Rain in the Doorway"
3. "Summer Holiday / A Misunderstood Man" (Brian Bennett, Bruce Welch / John Farrar, Tim Rice)
4. "Sallie's Song"
5. "The Lord's Seat"
6. "Mrs. Singer's Waltz"
7. "A Dublin Day"
8. "Simply Margaret"
9. "Heartsong"
10. "Lucifer's Cage"
11. "The Dodo's Dream (Demonstration)"

== Personnel ==
- Gordon Giltrap – all guitars
