= Water Bearer =

Studio album by Sally Oldfield
- Released: 1978
- Recorded: May 1978
- Genre: British folk rock; progressive rock; new age; folk-pop; progressive folk
- Length: 42:37
- Label: Bronze (UK); Chrysalis (US)
- Producer: Sally Oldfield

Sally Oldfield chronology
Water Bearer (1978)	Easy (1979)

Water Bearer is the debut studio album by British singer-songwriter Sally Oldfield, released in 1978.

The song "Mirrors" was released as a single, and reached No. 19 in the UK charts.

== Track listing ==
All songs written by Sally Oldfield. Quotations in "Songs of the Quendi" by J. R. R. Tolkien.

=== Side 1 ===
1. "Water Bearer" – 6:25
2. "Songs of the Quendi" – 12:46
  - "Night Theme"
  - "Wampum Song"
  - "Nenya"
  - "Land of the Sun"
3. "Mirrors" – 3:29 (This track, also released as a single, is missing from some versions)

=== Side 2 ===
1. "Weaver" – 3:38
2. "Night of the Hunter's Moon" – 3:26
3. "Child of Allah" – 3:19
4. "Song of the Bow" – 3:37
5. "Fire and Honey" – 2:30
6. "Song of the Healer" – 3:19

== Charts ==
Chart (1978/79)	Peak position
Australia (Kent Music Report)	94

== Personnel ==
- Sally Oldfield – vocals, guitar, piano, synthesizer, Moog Taurus, harpsichord, Farfisa Organ, mandolin, marimba, glockenspiel, vibraphone, percussion
- Frank Ricotti – percussion, vibraphone, marimba
- Dave Lawson – synthesizer
- Trevor Spencer – synth drums
- Tim Wheater – cymbal
- Jean Price – harp
- Brian Burrows – vocals

Also:

- Art Direction – Martin Poole
- Engineer – Ashley Howe, Dave Grinstead, Mark Dearnley
- Mixed By – Ashley Howe, Sally Oldfield
- Mixed By (Assistant) – John Gallen, Julian Cooper
- Photography – Paul Wakefield
- Typography – Mike Pratley
- Writer, Arranger and Producer – Sally Oldfield
