= Sally Oldfield =

Irish singer-songwriter

- Born: Sally Patricia Oldfield; 3 August 1947 (age 79); Dublin, Ireland
- Origin: Reading, Berkshire, England
- Genres: Pop, folk
- Occupation: Singer-songwriter
- Years active: 1968–present

Sally Patricia Oldfield (born 3 August 1947) is an English singer-songwriter. She is the sister of composers Mike and Terry Oldfield.

== Early life ==
Born in Dublin, Ireland, Oldfield was raised in the Roman Catholic faith of her mother, Maureen. Spending her childhood in Reading, Berkshire, Oldfield studied ballet from the age of four and won numerous competitions in all styles of dance, including ballet, tap and modern. At eleven, she won a scholarship to the Royal Academy of Dancing, then located in Holland Park, London, and two years later was starred to move on to the Royal Ballet School at White Lodge. However, she gave up ballet two years later, and achieved three A-Levels at Grade A. She studied classical piano to Grade 7. All her school years were spent at St Joseph's Convent School, Reading, where she became friends with Marianne Faithfull.

== Musical career ==
Oldfield's musical career started in 1967. While studying in Bristol she used to sing in the Bristol Troubadour Club, and was on the bill of a folk concert at the Colston Hall supporting the Strawberry Hill Boys (later Strawbs) and Fred Wedlock on 30 April. In early 1968 she made some demo recordings with her younger brother Mike Oldfield. These sessions were suggested and overseen by Mick Jagger. It is not known what became of those recordings.

Soon after this she founded the folk music duo the Sallyangie together with her brother Mike. The duo was signed to Transatlantic Records and recorded their only album at the recommendation of Pentangle band guitarist, John Renbourn, whom Oldfield met at the Bristol Troubadour Club. The album Children of the Sun was recorded in August 1968. The songs on it are mainly co-written by Sally and Mike Oldfield, and the album contained some of her brother's early guitar work. Guesting were Terry Cox on drums and Ray Warleigh on flute.

Oldfield's first mainstream recorded release was by a Finnish bass player named Pekka Pohjola. This album was mainly recorded at her brother's studio Througham Slad, Gloucestershire, between 22 November and 5 December 1976, and was originally released in 1977 as Keesojen Lehto by Pekka Pohjola. Later different labels translated the titles and changed the artist's name due to the name recognition of Mike Oldfield.

Oldfield's debut solo album, Water Bearer, was released in 1978. Her song, "Mirrors", was on the album. It peaked at No. 19 in the UK Singles Chart, spanning 1978 and 1979, and remained in that chart for 13 weeks. The song also peaked at number 88 in Australia.

Since then, she has released fifteen solo albums.

On the demise of her record label Bronze Records in 1984, Oldfield relocated to Germany and based her musical career there. Most of her albums from 1983 onwards were not released in the UK. She worked with many German record producers and musicians, including Gunther Mende and Candy DeRouge.

== Guest appearances ==
Oldfield provided background vocals in sections of brother Mike's 1970s albums Tubular Bells, Ommadawn and Incantations. She reprised her role on Tres Lunas in 2002 and for the 2003 re-recording, Tubular Bells 2003. In addition, she worked on her other brother Terry's recordings. She sang "Shadow of the Hierophant" on Steve Hackett's 1975 album, Voyage of the Acolyte.

== Discography ==
Solo

- 1978 – Water Bearer – AUS No. 94
- 1979 – Easy
- 1980 – Celebration
- 1981 – Playing in the Flame
- 1982 – In Concert
- 1983 – Strange Day in Berlin
- 1987 – Femme
- 1988 – Instincts
- 1990 – Natasha
- 1992 – The Flame as 'Natasha Oldfield'
- 1994 – Three Rings
- 1996 – Secret Songs
- 2001 – Flaming Star
- 2009 – Cantadora
- 2012 – Arrows of Desire
- 2018 – The Enchanted Way
- 2019 – Mystique

With Steve Hackett

- 1975 – Voyage of the Acolyte – vocals on "Shadow of the Hierophant"

With Mike Oldfield

- 1973 – Tubular Bells
- 1974 – Hergest Ridge
- 1975 – Ommadawn
- 1978 – Incantations
- 2002 – Tres Lunas
- 2003 – Tubular Bells 2003

With Pekka Pohjola

- 1977 – The Mathematician's Air Display
