= The Purple Gang (British band) =

British rock band

The Purple Gang are a British rock band active intermittently since the 1960s. They were originally associated with the London psychedelic scene. They released their debut album, The Purple Gang Strikes in 1968, with one track, "Granny Takes a Trip" banned from being broadcast by the BBC.

== History ==
Although they were associated with the London psychedelic music scene, they originated in Stockport, then in Cheshire, as The Young Contemporaries jugband. The band adopted the name, The Purple Gang, when they changed their image to the well-dressed, clean-cut "gangster" style in the 1960s. In London, they engaged Joe Boyd as their record producer, and shared a studio with Pink Floyd as they recorded their first single, "Granny Takes A Trip", named after the eponymous shop in the Kings Road, London. Pink Floyd were making their own first single, "Arnold Layne", at the time.

The BBC spotted the word 'trip' in the title and, assuming it to be a reference to LSD, banned the record from their airwaves. Also noting that the band's lead singer at the time (Pete Walker) was nicknamed 'Lucifer', the BBC Controller said "... a song with a dubious title designed to corrupt the nation's youth – and a band that boasts a warlock for a singer will not be tolerated by any decent society..." An album, The Purple Gang Strikes was released in 1968, but failed to sell, although Pirate radio station DJs such as John Peel praised the group. The band continued during the early 1970s, with a slightly different line-up.

In 1998 the band reformed and recorded an album, Night of the Uncool, with several new songs by Joe Beard, some of which were produced by Gerry Robinson, the mandolin and harmonica player from the original 1967 line-up. From 1999, their new lead vocalist was Stuart Pevitt (born 27 December 1952, Sale, Cheshire, England). They enjoyed some commercial success in Eastern Europe; in Bulgaria and Hungary one of their singles, "Sunset Over the Mersey", entered the national charts.

In 2003 they re-released The Purple Gang Strikes on CD. It contained remixes of several of their 1967 songs, including the BBC-banned track "Granny Takes A Trip". Another track, "Madam Judge", was their reply to the latter's banning.

Most of their songs were written by their early members: guitarist Joe Beard (born Christopher John Beard, 28 November 1945 in Macclesfield, Cheshire), and organist Geoff Bowyer (born Geoffrey Paul Bowyer, 1948 in Leek, Staffordshire). Some other members were vocalist Pete Walker (born Peter John Walker, 1946 in Hyde, North Cheshire), jug / banjo player Ank Langley (born Trevor Langley, 1946 in Stockport, Cheshire) and mandolin / harmonica player Gerry Robinson (born David John Robinson, 1947 in Hyde). Their musical influences and styles are varied, from jug band, country and western, through psychedelic, to rock music.

The band's unofficial headquarters was The Castle Inn, Macclesfield, where they regularly practised and jammed for their enthusiastic local fans.

Beard's biography of the band, Taking the Purple - The Extraordinary Story of The Purple Gang - Granny Takes a Trip... and All That was published in 2024.

Beard and Robinson released a new CD in 2014 – We Meant No Harm.

Pevitt died of cancer in 2009, aged 56. Robinson died on 14 September 2024, aged 76.

== Discography ==
- The Purple Gang Strikes (1968, re-released 2003)
- Night of the Uncool (1998)
