= Perilous Journey =

Studio album by Gordon Giltrap
- Released: 1 October 1977
- Recorded: 1977
- Studio: Redan Recorders; London, England
- Genre: Folk, progressive rock
- Label: The Electric Record Company (UK)
- Producer: Jon Miller, Rod Edwards, Roger Hand

Gordon Giltrap chronology
Visionary (1976)	Perilous Journey (1977)	Fear of the Dark (1978)

Professional ratings
Review scores
Source	Rating
Allmusic	2.5/5 stars

Perilous Journey is a 1977 studio album by guitarist Gordon Giltrap.

The album was remixed and re-released in 1998.

== Reception ==
AllMusic awarded the album with 2.5 stars and its review by Stewart Mason states: "Part of a trilogy of mid-'70s releases that presents a much different side of the folk-based guitarist Gordon Giltrap, 1977's Perilous Journey is a strictly instrumental album recorded with an enormous cadre of friends and studio musicians".

== Track listing ==
All music composed by Gordon Giltrap

=== Side one ===
No.	Title	Length
1.	"Quest"	5:11
2.	"The Deserter"	3:55
3.	"Pastoral"	5:20
4.	"Morbio Gorge"	4:15

=== Side two ===
No.	Title	Length
1.	"Heartsong"	5:01
2.	"Reflections & Despair"	3:24
3.	"Cascade"	3:40
4.	"To the High Throne"	2:52
5.	"Vision"	3:46

== Personnel ==
- Gordon Giltrap - guitars
- Rod Edwards - keyboards
- John G. Perry - bass
- Simon Phillips - drums

with:

- Tony Carr - percussion
- Rod Edwards - additional keyboards
- Roger Ball - alto saxophone on "The Deserter" and "Morbio Gorge"
- Malcolm Duncan - tenor saxophone on "Morbio Gorge"
- Stan Sulzmann - tenor saxophone
- Jeff Daly - baritone saxophone
- Henry Lowther, Martin Drover - trumpet
- Chris Pyne - trombone
- Patrick Halling - strings leader

Technical

- Roger T. Wake - engineer
- Jean Luke Epstein - art direction, illustration
