= Transatlantic Records =

British record label

Transatlantic Records was a British independent record label. The company was established in 1961, primarily as an importer of American folk, blues and jazz records by many of the artists who influenced the burgeoning British folk and blues boom. Within a few years, the company had started recording British and Irish artists. The company's philosophy was intentionally eclectic.

== History ==
The label was founded by Englishman Nat Joseph who started the company at the age of 21 after visiting the US and realizing that there was a wealth of recorded music that was unavailable in the UK. Transatlantic licensed recordings from the US, such as the jazz labels Prestige and Riverside and the Tradition folk music label. From the outset, many of the covers included photography and design by Brian Shuel. Transatlantic were also instrumental in the importation of MK Records (a Russian classical label), which were then issued with the original Russian labels, but with an English printed sleeve.

The company's first commercial success came not from music but from three sex education albums. The controversy over these records led to sales approaching 100,000 and the resulting financial lift gave the company money to develop its musical base.

Some of their early records included artists such as The Dubliners, actress Sheila Hancock, jazz singer Annie Ross, actresses Jean Hart and Isla Cameron, and Shakespearean actor Tony Britton. They managed to mix the folk music interest with the money making capacity of the sex education records by issuing When Dalliance was in Flower – a series of bawdy songs performed by Ed McCurdy and licensed from the American Elektra label. As often happened, these were issued first on the Transatlantic label in the UK and then on the subsidiary label XTRA. The catalogue numbers often contained "TRA" within the prefix, thus MTRA, XTRA, and LTRA were all used. The latter prefix was used with a series of LPs produced by Bill Leader (who worked with Nat Joseph from the outset as an engineer). Amongst these "Leader" records were recordings by Nic Jones, Martin Simpson, Mick Ryan, Bandoggs (another Nic Jones group), Andrew Cronshaw, and Al O'Donnell. The XTRA imprint was launched as a discount label to release recordings licensed from the American Folkways label and elsewhere.

With the advent of psychedelia and flower power the Transatlantic stable of artists achieved greater success, culminating in the formation of the supergroup Pentangle. Meanwhile, Transatlantic had been extending its eclecticism, recording such as the audio collageist Ron Geesin, and The Purple Gang, whose "Granny Takes A Trip" was banned by the BBC in 1967. CBS had released the extremely successful contemporary music budget sampler with The Rock Machine Turns You On in 1967. Before CBS could follow up, Transatlantic released Listen Here! early in 1968. Like Rock Machine the record was priced at 14/11d (£0.75) – but Transatlantic took promotion one stage further by printing not only the track listing on the front, but also the price. The record was designed to preview not only the forthcoming Pentangle double album, but solo records by members Bert Jansch and John Renbourn. Listen Here! also served to introduce a new group The Sallyangie, with siblings Mike and Sally Oldfield.

In 1975, Joseph sold a 75% share of his company to Sidney Bernstein's Granada Group and the company became part of Granada. There was a culture clash between the independent-spirited Transatlantic and the corporate sensibilities of Granada and two years later Granada sold its share in Transatlantic to the Marshall Cavendish publishing company, which also acquired Joseph's 25% share. The new company was renamed Logo Records. In the 1990s, Logo Records and the Transatlantic catalogue were sold to Castle Communications (later Sanctuary Records, now under the control of BMG Rights Management).

== Roster (1961–1978) ==
- Alberto Y Lost Trios Paranoias
- Marc Brierley
- Dave Cartwright
- Circus
- CMU
- Billy Connolly
- Contraband
- Country Gazette
- Reverend Gary Davis
- The Deviants
- The Dubliners
- The Fugs
- Finbar & Eddie Furey
- Ron Geesin
- The Glenside Ceili Band
- Jody Grind
- Gryphon
- The Grehan Sisters
- The Humblebums
- Ian Campbell Group
- Hamish Imlach
- Bert Jansch
- Víctor Jara
- The Johnstons
- Alexis Korner
- Little Free Rock
- The McCalmans
- Mae McKenna
- Ralph McTell
- Marsupilami
- Metro
- Pasadena Roof Orchestra
- Pentangle
- Portsmouth Sinfonia
- Gerry Rafferty
- John James
- John Renbourn
- The Sallyangie
- Silly Wizard
- Skin Alley
- Storyteller
- Stray
- Unicorn
- The Young Tradition

== Artist roster (1994 onwards) ==
- Big Country
- Fairport Convention
- The Tansads

== See also ==
- List of record labels
- List of independent UK record labels
