= From Brush and Stone =

Studio album by Gordon Giltrap and Rick Wakeman
- Released: July 19, 2010
- Genre: Progressive rock
- Label: Gonzo
- Producer: Erik Jordan, Gordon Giltrap and Rick Wakeman

From Brush & Stone is a studio album by guitarist Gordon Giltrap and keyboardist Rick Wakeman. The album is the first opportunity to record together for Gordon Giltrap and Rick Wakeman. Both are long time friends who have been on separate musical paths for forty years until this release in 2010 on Voiceprint in the UK.

== Track listing ==
1. "The Savannah Bird" - 3:22
2. "Caesar Augustus" - 8:06
3. "The Kiss" - 4:19
4. "Hermes" - 3:19
5. "The Thinker" - 4:45
6. "David" - 3:23
7. "The Discus Thrower" - 3:07
8. "The Last of England" - 5:09
9. "Spring" - 2:49
10. "The Death of Chatterton" - 5:28
11. "The Light of the World" - 3:10
12. "Work" - 3:50
13. "By Angle Tarn" - 3:54
14. "Maddie Goes West" - 4:08

== Personnel ==
- Gordon Giltrap - guitars
- Rick Wakeman - keyboards

== Production ==
- Produced by Erik Jordan, Gordon Giltrap and Rick Wakeman.
- Guitar recording sessions engineered by Paul White at Malvern Studios.
- Keyboard recording sessions engineered by Erik Jordan at Pavilion Studios.
- Mixed by Erik Jordan at Jordan Audio Studios.
- Artwork by Jan Leytham-Gain.
- Additional photography by Lee Wilkinson.
- Special thanks to Malcolm 'Mad Malc' Welch.
