= Secret Valentine (album) =

Studio album by Gordon Giltrap
- Released: 2007
- Recorded: 2007
- Genre: Folk
- Label: Voiceprint (UK)

Gordon Giltrap chronology
| Captured From a Point in Time (2006) | Secret Valentine (2007) | As It Happens... (2009) |

Secret Valentine is a 2007 studio album by guitarist Gordon Giltrap. It is a collection of 15 of Giltrap's favourite romantic pieces. The album was recorded entirely on the revolutionary new Cool Acoustics / Rob Armstrong hybrid acoustic guitar to be known as the Secret Valentine guitar. Giltrap was involved with the project to develop the new guitar for several years and regularly uses one during live performances.

== Track listing ==
All music by Gordon Giltrap.

1. "Maddie Goes West"
2. "Under This Blue Sky"
3. "Kaz"
4. "The Picnic"
5. "Elegy (The Death of Chatterton)"
6. "Down The River"
7. "By Angle Tarn"
8. "A Christmas Carol"
9. "The Lord's Seat"
10. "Prayer for Philippa"
11. "Isabella's Wedding"
12. "The Echoing Green / London"
13. "Secret Valentine"

== Personnel ==
- Gordon Giltrap - Guitars
