= Visionary (Gordon Giltrap album) =

Studio album by Gordon Giltrap
- Released: 1976
- Recorded: October 1975 – June 1976
- Studio: Sound Associates Studio
- Genre: Folk, progressive rock
- Length: 52:57
- Label: The Electric Record Company (UK)
- Producer: Jon Miller, Rod Edwards, Roger Hand

Gordon Giltrap chronology
A Testament of Time (1971)	Visionary (1976)	Perilous Journey (1977)

Visionary is a 1976 album by guitarist Gordon Giltrap.

The music is inspired by the words of poet William Blake. Side one by the illustration "The Day of Judgement" and the poem "The Last Judgement". Side two by the poems and illustrations as titled.

== Track listing ==
All music composed by Gordon Giltrap

=== Side one ===
1. "Awakening" – 3:01
2. "Robes and Crowns" – 1:23
3. "From The Four Winds" – 3:30
4. "Lucifer's Cage" – 4:07
5. "Revelation" – 3:45

=== Side two ===
1. "The Price of Experience" – 2:22
2. "The Dance of Albion" – 1:57
3. "The Tyger" – 2:00
4. "The Echoing Green" – 2:02
5. "London" – 3:01
6. "Night" – 3:52

=== bonus tracks for Voiceprint 1999CD ===
1. "On Wings of Hope" – 3:10
2. "Jerusalem" – 3:28
3. "Visionary" (original version) – 15:19

== Personnel ==
- Gordon Giltrap - guitars (Fylde 12-string acoustic, John Bailey 6-string acoustic, double neck 6- and 12-string electric)
- Rod Edwards - keyboards
- John G. Perry - bass
- Simon Phillips - drums

with:

- R.W. "Butch" Hudson - trumpet
- Henry Lowther - trumpet
- Chris Pyne - trombone
- Chris Mercer - alto and tenor saxophone
- Jeff Daly - baritone saxophone
- Tony Carr - percussion
- Roger Hand - percussion
- Shirlie Roden - vocals
- Strings led by Patrick Halling; George Hamer - contractor
- Music by Gordon Giltrap – inspired by the works of William Blake
- Arranged by Rod Edwards and Roger Hand; except "From the Four Winds" arranged by Joel Lazar
- Recorded between October 1975 and June 1976 at Sound Associate Studios
- Engineered by Gareth Edwards
- Mastered by Harry Fisher at Decca Studios
