= Gordon Giltrap =

English guitarist and composer (born 1948)

Gordon Giltrap MBE
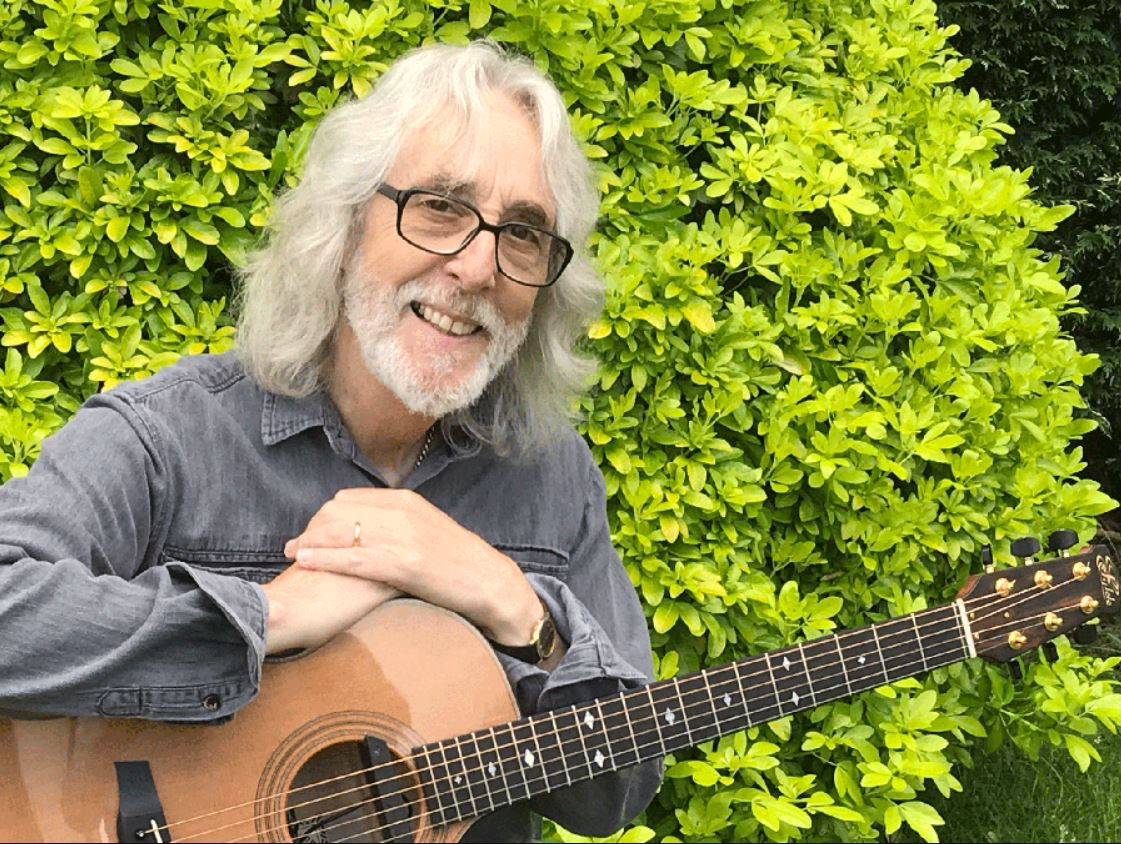
- Giltrap in 2019

Background information
- Born: 6 April 1948 (age 78); Brenchley, Kent, England
- Genres: Progressive rock, classical, folk, Celtic
- Occupations: Guitarist; composer
- Instrument: Guitar
- Spouse: Hilary Giltrap (m. 1986; died 2022)
- Website: www.giltrap.co.uk

Gordon Giltrap (born 6 April 1948) is an English guitarist and composer. His music crosses several genres. He has been described as "one of the most revered guitarists of his generation", and has drawn praise from fellow musicians including Steve Rothery, Ritchie Blackmore and Jimmy Page.

== Early life ==
Giltrap was born on 6 April 1948 in the village of Brenchley, Kent, England, at the British Hospital for Mothers and Babies. Thereafter, he was brought up in Deptford, south east London, spending the first 11 years of his life at 43 Elverson Road, a two up, two down terraced house shared by two households with an outside toilet. His family then moved to Blackwall Lane, East Greenwich. Rock star Marty Wilde grew up in the same area, along with guitarist Albert Lee. Giltrap began to play the guitar at the age of 12, receiving no formal tuition, choosing instead to develop his own style and technique.

== Career ==
Giltrap's career began in the 1960s performing in the folk music scene in London alongside contemporaries such as Bert Jansch, John Renbourn, and Mike Oldfield. Giltrap was part of the band Accolade in 1969-1970 after which he went solo again. At 18, Giltrap signed with Transatlantic Records and released his debut studio albums, Gordon Giltrap (1968) and Portrait (1969). Both featured Giltrap on guitar and lead vocals; he has since considered his lyrics "naive". The track "Willow Pattern" from his debut attracted the praise of guitarist Ralph McTell for the imagery it portrayed. "Gospel Song", also from his first, features a more aggressive strumming style, influenced by Pete Townshend, which later became a trademark of his style. In 1969, Giltrap was featured in Transatlantic's guitar showcase album The Contemporary Guitar Sampler, Volume 1. He was also featured on the second volume released in 1970, and both increased his profile.

Shortly after the release of his first album, Giltrap joined The Buskers' Tour of the UK, headlined by Don Partridge. Giltrap subsequently formed a band with Partridge called Accolade. Together they released a self-titled album. Partridge later wrote the sleeve notes for Portrait. Giltrap played lead guitar in the band and penned several compositions. Whilst his involvement in the band certainly helped to raise his profile he felt impatient to move on to recording further new albums under his own name.

=== 1970s ===
In 1970, Giltrap signed to MCA Records and released his next album, Testament of Time, which was again a mixture of songs and instrumental pieces. on two future albums. It was to be one of the pieces he chose to play on his first television appearance, on Disco 2.

At this stage, he was managed by Miles Copeland who, amongst others, also managed Wishbone Ash. Strings on the album were arranged by Del Newman, who also played keyboards. Newman had already worked with many artists of that era including Cat Stevens. Thus began a lasting friendship, and later Giltrap wrote the foreword for Newman's 2010 autobiography A Touch From God (It's Only Rock and Roll). With Newman's influence, the album had a much fuller sound than Giltrap's previous two albums and he regarded it as a significant step forward.

His association with Copeland ended when he moved to Philips Records, releasing the 1973 album entitled Giltrap. This album featured a much larger band. On some of the songs he experimented with early instruments (played by Douglas Wooton and Rod and Joseph Sleeping) and some of his lyrics clearly reflected an interest in historical events. The drummer on this album was Nicko McBrain, who a decade later would join Iron Maiden. The front cover photographs reflect Giltrap as a proud father blowing bubbles together with his then two-year-old son, Jamie. The opening track, "When I See My Son", further reflected that pride. This was the last album on which he sang lead vocals. As he became less convinced by his lyric writing capabilities he began seeking a different path.

While popular on the folk and university circuit, Giltrap reached a turning point and received greater recognition during the 1970s. During this time, Giltrap started to concentrate on more purely instrumental pieces, and in 1976 released the album Visionary, based on the art and poetry of William Blake. Whilst recording, he missed the birth of his daughter Sadie, who was born in March 1975.

Visionary was produced by Jon Miller, who along with guitarist Roger Hand and keyboard player Rod Edwards were known as Triumvirate Productions. Hand and Edwards, having listened to demos of some of the material for Visionary, decided that it was time for Giltrap to be dragged, initially reluctantly, into the realm of rock music. With this new sound, however, Giltrap found a different audience and gained greater commercial success. The success of this album prompted Giltrap to move on from the singer-songwriter approach and to form the Gordon Giltrap Band, which toured extensively in the UK at that time.

Once the demos for Visionary were finished, Giltrap found himself with a three-album record contract with Electric Records. He was then offered a UK tour supporting the English progressive rock band Renaissance. He was invited to appear on BBC's The Old Grey Whistle Test hosted by Bob Harris. Supported by his full band, they performed "Robes and Crowns/Awakening" and "Lucifer's Cage". Footage of the latter performance can be seen on the program 'Guitar Heroes at the BBC'.

A European tour followed at the end of 1976 as a support act to Wishbone Ash. They played several dates in Germany and were also booked to tour Switzerland. Unfortunately, upon arriving in Zurich Giltrap was hit by a car and broke his collarbone. As he was then unable to play guitar the rest of his tour was cancelled.

His follow-up album, Perilous Journey, consolidated his success, being named one of the best albums of 1977 by The Sunday Times. It peaked in the UK Albums Chart at No. 29. A single taken from the album, "Heartsong", received extensive airplay and reached No. 21 in the UK Singles Chart. The track was later used as the theme tune of the BBC TV series Holiday. Another of Giltrap's tracks, "The Carnival", was specially commissioned by ITV for the theme tune to ITV's holiday programme Wish You Were Here...?.

"Heartsong" has subsequently become the tune for which Giltrap is best known and still features in his live sets. "Heartsong" was eventually nominated for an Ivor Novello Award for the best instrumental/ orchestral piece for that year, losing to Elton John's "Song for Guy". Giltrap later said of the track's creation, "It began with a song I did in the late '60s called 'Starting All Over'. When I lived in London I began to mess around with it and stumbled on the riff for what would become 'Heartsong'. I kept working on it, and eventually recorded the guitar part for it. Then we added the rhythm section from Simon Phillips (drums) and John G. Perry (bass)."

"At the time I never thought of this as anything other than a jolly little tune, but my producers Rod Edwards and Roger Hand realized the commercial potential in what we had. The melody really came out when the mini moog part was added, and then Eddie Spence (keyboards) came up with the fast moving synth figure. Edwards and Hand recorded Eddie at half speed, then played it back at normal speed to get the desired effect. That was something they learnt from working with George Martin." Whilst Visionary had evolved from acoustic compositions adapted for a bigger band, Perilous Journey was composed with a bigger band sound in mind. It appeared occasionally to be more keyboard dominated but Giltrap was unperturbed by this as the pieces were his own compositions and he was pleased with the arrangements which he had worked on with Rod Edwards and Roger Hand.

In this period, albums had to flow from artists at consistent rates and few acts dared to allow time for the public to forget them. Such was the case with Giltrap who released his next album, Fear of the Dark, in 1978. At this stage, after the success of his previous two albums, Giltrap was riding on a high. Material for Fear of the Dark was relatively swiftly assembled.

The title track, in shortened form, was released as a single but failed to match the commercial success of "Heartsong". It reached number 48 in the singles charts and the band appeared on Top of the Pops. Another song on the album, "Fast Approaching", was a reworked track, vastly different from the original which had appeared on Giltrap's first album. It was extended to five minutes and featured Giltrap on both acoustic and electric guitars. He was now becoming far more familiar with the latter instrument and at this stage really enjoyed playing his Gibson Les Paul. Giltrap's electric guitar playing is a feature on this album but he was always first and foremost an acoustic guitarist and before too long the electric guitar featured less and less in his work.

In 1979, Giltrap toured the Fear of the Dark album with a band that consisted of John Gustafson on bass, who was active in the early Mersey scene and a top session player, and Ian Mosley on drums, who went on to work with Steve Hackett and latterly became a full-time member of Marillion. Old stalwarts Rod Edwards and Eddy Spence shared keyboard duties. Singer Shirlie Roden made a guest appearance on '"Innerdream". One of the dates on the tour was at the Oxford Polytechnic, where the subsequent Live at Oxford album was recorded.

By this stage in Giltrap's career, he was beginning to be concerned about becoming too predictable. He decided to move away from playing with a band and move back towards solo work. Giltrap's next album, The Peacock Party, which was released in 1979, was inspired by a book of the same name. This was in part illustrated by Alan Aldridge, who also painted the colourful cover of the Giltrap album. A previous book entitled The Butterfly Ball and the Grasshopper's Feast had inspired an album by Roger Glover of Deep Purple, which featured a host of stars. The triumvirate team had also been working on an album inspired by the book featuring the voices of Judi Dench and Michael Hordern, and it also featured celebrated musicians including Gerry Conway and Bruce Lynch, both of whom had previously worked extensively with Cat Stevens. Aldridge appeared to prefer Triumvirates's version and it was he who brought his next book The Peacock Party to the Triumvirate team to see if they were interested in another project. Triumvirate felt this was a good project for Giltrap to pursue.

Giltrap's pieces on this album are less complicated but still feature a full band sound. The whole feel of the album is more upbeat than his previous three. The tracks are shorter in length and, ironically, feature Giltrap playing more electric guitar than previous albums.

Giltrap had decided at this stage to move away from more commercial music and concentrate solely upon self-penned intricate guitar pieces. Whilst working on The Peacock Party, he decided to retain the big band sound and incorporated many musicians within his pieces with whom he felt comfortable working. For example, the album featured the first of Giltrap's several collaborations with violinist Ric Sanders of Fairport Convention and John Etheridge of Soft Machine also features.

This album showcased Giltrap's talents from his strident electric guitar work on the opening track, "Headwind" to the intricacy of second acoustic track "Magpie Rag". This track incorporates a complex, oft-repeated riff around which the whole piece is based. The final track, "Dodo's Dream" has become a standard feature of his live performances in which he uses a looper and overdubbing to build up the piece.

When he finished recording, he embarked on a small tour in his favoured trio format which featured Ric Sanders on violin and long-term ally Eddie Spence on keyboards. This diversion concluded at a difficult time in Giltrap's life, when his first marriage broke up and his mother, with whom he was very close, died at age 58, having contracted cancer .

The tour to promote the album comprised Giltrap, Clive Bunker on drums, Rod Edwards on keyboards and 'Bimbo' Acock on saxophone, flute and additional keyboards. The tour was a success and boosted Giltrap at a time when he was feeling really low.

=== 1980s ===
Giltrap's next album, Airwaves, released in 1981, evolved from the lineup of the band with whom Giltrap was performing. This was a different album to any previously produced as Giltrap did not compose every piece. Initially planned as music for TV, radio, film or other non-commercial use, the recordings gradually morphed into an album which was eventually released. It did not sell as well as previous Giltrap recordings, and he himself felt somewhat detached from it as he was going through a difficult time in his life. There were to be no more Giltrap albums released for five years.

Performing gigs, however, did not stop, as income still needed to be earned and Giltrap was pleased that he had learnt his craft as a solo performer thus not requiring the backing of a large band. During this time, he honed his skills of engaging with an audience.

Giltrap's life during this time went through a turbulent stage with the loss of his father at age 66, the fact he had two children to bring up and meeting Hilary, who was to become his second wife. He gradually began to get his life back to some sort of order. He was also gigging through this entire time and had joined up with Ric Sanders, the violinist of Fairport Convention. Sanders had already appeared as a guest on Giltrap's album Peacock Party.

The title track, the longest on the album, was based upon a poem written by Elizabeth Barker, Giltrap's mother-in-law. Giltrap found the poem emotionally moving. On this track, the sound effects generated by the electric guitar are much in evidence.

"Sallie's Song" was inspired by a commission Giltrap received for the TV series Hold the Back Page starring David Warner and directed by Adrian Shergold. Shergold later commissioned Giltrap to write music for several further productions. These compositions were never released on album because Giltrap felt they were too intrinsically linked to the plot of the films to work as stand-alone pieces.

Later in 1987, Giltrap released A Midnight Clear, featuring instrumental renditions of well-known and lesser-known Christmas carols. Giltrap enlisted the support of Ric Sanders and his old friend Bimbo Acock.

The following year, Giltrap began to performs at gigs with Sanders and the two men began working on an album together. Entitled One to One, it was released in 1989. Both artists felt differently about it but both accept there was an instrumental imbalance which could be substantially improved with a remix.

=== 1990s ===
In 1992, Giltrap performed at the Warwick Folk Festival when he performed, arguably, his finest live session. Unbeknownst to Giltrap, this was recorded and later released as an album. It was this album which caught the attention of Ritchie Blackmore, who had become a self-professed admirer of Giltrap's work.

In 1993, Giltrap was able to complete a project he had contemplated for some time. He wished to re-record "Heartsong" with famous friends Brian May, Steve Howe, Rick Wakeman, Midge Ure and Neil Murray. When completed there was little interest from record companies and it was two years before the track surfaced on an album.

Later that year, Giltrap joined Midge Ure on his Out Alone solo tour. Giltrap co-wrote a song with him entitled "Feel So Good" which was eventually released on the 2001 album Little Orphans. He also undertook a tour with a guitarist he greatly admired, Albert Lee, along with his band Hogan's Heroes.

In 1994, Giltrap toured with ELO Part II. a group created by ELO drummer Bev Bevan without the involvement of Jeff Lynne. Giltrap was disappointed that his name did not appear on any advertising poster, nor was he actually remunerated for his performances. These were very well received and resulted in good CD sales.

Giltrap had used a Fylde guitar on "Heartsong" which had been greatly admired by Cliff Richard. This guitar is the one he played on BBC's Top of the Pops. Whilst interviewing many musicians for Guitarist magazine, Giltrap met Cliff Richard for the first time since the 1970s when he had originally loaned Richard the Fylde. It had an intricately designed inlay of the 'Tree of Life' on the fretboard and Richard loved it. Giltrap decided to present it to him as a gift.

In 1995, Giltrap released the album Music for the Small Screen. Not many of these pieces, composed as the theme tunes for television programmes, had appeared on his albums. The album featured the all-star reworking of "Heartsong" and also a track entitled "Last of England", later to be the title of a highly regarded album, which had been used in the Adrian Shergold drama Will You Love Me Tomorrow. This play was loosely based on the actions of child killer Mary Bell and featured Giltrap in a cameo role as a newspaper seller strumming a guitar.

This album also featured a track entitled "The Lord's Seat" which had been written for a television documentary. It still remains a staple of Giltrap gigs. The track was written in a Renaissance style and required a special, lute-like baby guitar made by luthier Rob Armstrong. Another track on the album, "Brutus", had been used as the theme tune of the World Bowls Championship.

In 1995, Giltrap was invited by Cliff Richard to take part in his West End musical Heathcliff, which was based upon the Wuthering Heights novel by Charlotte Brontë. Giltrap's character in the show was the Troubadour. He sang three songs in the show.

After some public previews at Earls Court, Heathcliff premiered at the National Indoor Theatre in Birmingham in October 1996. The show then headed to Edinburgh Playhouse for a four-week run before returning to Birmingham for a few pre-Christmas shows. It then travelled to the Palace Theatre in Manchester and finally Hammersmith Odeon before its final performance there in May 1997. Heathcliff reached an audience of nearly half a million people during its run and broke box-office records at almost every theatre at which the production was staged. Whilst not popular with critics, a video of the show recorded at Hammersmith Odeon remained top of the video charts for eight weeks.

Giltrap's next album, Troubadour, was named after his character in Heathcliff. Troubadour gave Giltrap the chance to approach his old friend Del Newman to work on the string arrangements for the album. Newman wanted to produce the album himself to ensure the right balance between his string arrangements and Giltrap's guitar.

When he heard that the album was going to include a version of "A Misunderstood Man", Cliff Richard approached Giltrap and volunteered to sing backing vocals on the track. Troubadour also includes another song from the Heathcliff musical: "Be With Me Always". The first edition of the album included sleeve notes written by both Cliff Richard and Tim Rice. An important album for Giltrap, many of its tracks are frequently included in his live performances to this day.

One of the album's tracks, "Rain in the Doorway", utilised a beloved baby guitar purchased at a boot sale for £5. It has since been renovated and usually accompanies Giltrap on his gigs, used primarily for the piece "Appalachian Dreaming". The album gained very favourable reviews and sold well.

Alongside his continued live performances, Giltrap then began conducting celebrity interviews for Guitarist magazine. This led to him meeting Fay Goodman, who was considering producing a series of DVD interviews with prominent musicians. Once employed, Giltrap found himself interviewing stars such as Albert Lee and Tony Iommi. One such interview was with one of his heroes, John Entwistle of the Who. Their encounter was later released as a DVD entitled Thunderfingers.

=== 2000s ===
For some time, Giltrap had been considering creating a tribute album to Bert Jansch, whom he greatly admired. The result was an album comprising six pieces. One of these tracks required vocals which Giltrap himself performed. The track, entitled 'Running From Home', was the first time Giltrap had sung on an album in 17 years.

During this album, Giltrap attempted to demonstrate Jansch's great versatility of skills in the selection of pieces he chose for the album, performing each in Janch's unique style. This is amply demonstrated by Ewan MacColl's "The First Time Ever I Saw Your Face", a track which Jansch had played in his unique style and which Giltrap followed faithfully in his interpretation of the song. Another notable track on the album was another piece previously interpreted by Jansch: Davey Graham's "Anji". This piece (spelt "Angie" on the album) had also influenced Giltrap's early work.

The album concluded with a version of "Roots", Giltrap's own composition which had first appeared on his Fear of the Dark album. He included this to show the influence Jansch had had on his own guitar style.

Janschology was released on the 'Voiceprint' label in 2001. Giltrap was by now working on new material for his next album, Under This Blue Sky, which was to be released the following year. Giltrap recruited additional musicians to play on the album, the most significant of whom was Bert Jansch himself. Jansch plays on the track "Chambertin". This track had appeared on his previous album but was now considerably lengthened. The album also featured the talents of flautist Hillary Ashe-Roy.

Giltrap decided to include his version of George Harrison's "Here Comes the Sun". He used a baby Armstrong guitar for this piece and, although he never met George Harrison, he was indirectly the person who introduced him to that guitar. This happened via his friend, Joe Brown, who was so impressed with the instrument when Giltrap demonstrated it to him, that he sent one to Harrison as a Christmas present. Harrison loved it too and purchased two more as gifts for his close friends.

Another track revisited on this album was the Troubadour piece "The Picnic". This piece became enlivened by Ashe-Roy's skills on the flute and Giltrap was delighted with the result. The flautist's skills were also in evidence on another track, "Crossing the Border", on which the duo were joined by a second guitarist, Kevin Dempsey, with whom Giltrap had toured as a duo several years earlier.

In 2003, the album Remember This was released. Featuring some original Giltrap recordings, it mostly contains renditions of compositions which influenced the young Giltrap. These included "Substitute" by the Who, as Giltrap had long been an admirer of Pete Townshend's skills on the guitar. The album also includes Cliff Richard's "Summer Holiday", as well as pieces by Django Reinhardt, John Renbourn and J.S. Bach.

Giltrap performed most pieces himself but on a couple of tracks he enlisted the help of guitarist Neville Marten and, once again, the flautist Hilary Ashe-Roy. Two of Giltrap's original tracks featured accompaniment by Rick Wakeman as these had previously been recorded for a radio programme.

In 2001, Giltrap met the classical guitarist Raymond Burley. Burley listened to Giltrap's work and, liking what he heard, realised that they might be able to make music together. This resulted in a collaborative album called Double Vision, which was released in 2004. The album was recorded live at Holy Trinity church in Weston, East Hampshire. This was the beginning of a collaboration between the two friends which would last several years.

Next came the solo album Live At Ambergate. This album explored the unusual sound effects of binaural recording which was recorded using in-ear microphones.

The next studio album, Drifter, was released in 2004. This featured a very special violin played by John Bradbury. This violin Giltrap had picked up at a boot fair for £20. He asked somebody to look at it to see if it was any good. It turned out to be a violin made by Giuseppe Pedrazzini who was a celebrated early 20th century violin maker, and was worth £30,000, This instrument was used on three tracks on the album. Giltrap eventually parted with the violin for £23,000.

The violin features on the opening track of the album, "Mrs Singer's Waltz". This is followed by another track, a regular piece in Giltrap's current live performances, entitled "Maddie Goes West". It features banjo player Madelyn Martyn who was just about to take a trip to America, hence the title.

The title track, "Drifter", was, interestingly, also recorded on another guitar purchased cheaply at a boot fair. Giltrap's wife, Hilary, helped out with the vocals on this track.

Giltrap had previously received a call from somebody who worked for music publishing company wondering if he could write a piece in the style of Django Reinhardt. Giltrap duly created a piece entitled "Deco Echo". This piece was later to be used on a television programme about the Poirot series which starred David Suchet.

The album had a sleeve with the lone silhouetted figure of Giltrap looking like a drifter. The photo had been taken by his wife Hilary and they were both delighted with it particularly when they realised that it suited the title of the album perfectly.

No further original Giltrap albums were to be forthcoming for several years but in 2006 a concert at the Symphony Hall Birmingham was filmed.

In 2007, Giltrap released the album Secret Valentine. This album re-visited some of his favourite romantic pieces. It was basically created to feature the sound of a Rob Armstrong guitar which had been designed as part of a research project and was made entirely out of a plastic polymer. Giltrap released this and amply demonstrated the versatility of that instrument.

A live album, As It Happens..., was released later in 2007, with which Giltrap himself was very pleased.

The following year saw the launch of a venture entitled Three Parts Guitar. Double Vision had not been as successful as hoped due to a perceived clash in styles between Burley and Giltrap. The pair, however, convinced their collaboration had a future, enlisted the talented jazz-based guitarist John Etheridge to join them in a tour. This proved extremely successful. In concert, they each played a solo session before the finale where they joined together to play some of Gordon's pieces. The show in the Symphony Hall in Birmingham in September 2008 was performed to capacity crowd with special guest Rick Wakeman.

John Etheridge could not totally commit to the tour as he was also working with classical guitar star John Williams. Clive Carrol was approached to see if he would step in if required. Having seen Carrol play guitar Festival, it was John Renbourn who recommended him. Giltrap too was also hugely impressed with his talent. Etheridge, however, then committed to the project and Carrol was asked to join the group which then became Four Parts Guitar, thus forming a collaboration which worked well for several more years.

For some time, Giltrap and Rick Wakeman had been planning to make an album together. They decided that the time had now arrived. Giltrap's love of Renaissance art contrasting with Wakeman's love of sculpture resulted in the album's title From Brush and Stone. The album, divided in two by composer, featured tracks with each adding accompaniment to each other's compositions. Giltrap's pieces were mainly a reworking of his Brotherhood Suite and these were complemented by versions of the aforementioned "Maddie Goes West" and a piece entitled "By Angle Tarn".

The duo's collaboration continued when Wakeman undertook a solo tour entitled Grumpy Old Picture Show. It included a previously recorded video conversation with Giltrap, which was worked so that Wakeman appeared to be conversing live with Giltrap on stage.

=== 2010s ===
Wakeman also appeared on Giltrap's next album, Shining Morn, which was released in 2010. The title piece appears twice on the album, first as a solo and again as the concluding track which incorporates Wakeman on keyboards. The flautist Hilary Ash-Roy appears once again on "Joy Ride" and "Prayer for Philippa". Another track, "Forever Gold", was written to celebrate Cliff Richard's 50 years in show business.

Several older compositions are revisited on the album. One, "Ive's Horizon", first appeared on Giltrap's very first album which was released in 1968. Another, "The Passing Of A Queen", had originally appeared on the 1973 Giltrap album. Shining Morn also features a new version of "Dodo's Dream", which had become a staple of Giltrap's concerts. This version with overdubbing tries to replicate the feeling given during live performances of the piece.

In 2012, Giltrap, reflecting upon the work he had done since Elegy, decided to change tack and produce a completely different type of album. To this end, he teamed up with Oliver Wakeman (one of Rick's sons), who had recently departed from the band Yes. The pair of them produced together the prog rock album Ravens and Lullabies, which was released the following year.

Giltrap decided that this collaboration was to involve both their writing skills. Wakeman arranged Esoteric as the record label, found recording studios and located a suitable vocalist in the form of Paul Manzi.

This album reacquainted Giltrap with the electric guitar. Despite on many previous occasions revealing considerable skills with this instrument, he still lacked faith in his own abilities. The results he achieved even surprised himself.

The track "From the Turn of a Card" featured the vocals of Benoit David with whom Wakeman had worked during his time with the band Yes. The album was well received and sold well.

The album was supported by a tour complete with a full band. Giltrap felt uncomfortable attempting to play all the necessary guitar parts himself which would have involved frequent changes of instrument. For this reason, they drafted in guitarist Nick Kendall. The band headlined the Summer's End prog rock festival to great acclaim and, their live show proved to be an enormous success.

Giltrap also undertook a tour with Oliver Wakeman at this time with both artists showcasing their own material. They were recruited to support Barclay James Harvest on their 2013 tour.

Alongside his performances with the Ravens band, during 2014 Giltrap continued to tour with his Four Parts Guitar ensemble. Later that year he began performing charity shows at St Giles Hospice in Sutton Coldfield. These gigs were well attended and Giltrap found them very uplifting.

In January the following year, Giltrap's health began to suffer. He was getting uncomfortable gastric symptoms and these turned out to be very serious when, in June 2015, he was diagnosed with having a GIST or gastrointestinal stromal tumor. He was referred eventually to Queen Elizabeth Hospital in Birmingham. Surgery took place on 6 May 2016 and was considerably more invasive than they had hoped it would be. During this time he was supported by his friend, singer / songwriter Carrie Martin, who helped both himself and Hilary through a very traumatic period of their lives. After surgery, which was to prove to be twice as long as expected, Giltrap was very weak and there initially was concern for his future. However, he gradually regained his strength, returning home just a fortnight later. A period of convalescence followed and gradually, despite occasional setbacks, he recovered.

Upon recovery, Giltrap continued gigging and he also began to run workshops teaching his guitar pieces to groups of students. These events have proved popular and have become regular, most recently taking place at a large scout hall near his home in Sutton Coldfield. Events are publicised and sold through his website. Giltrap is a member of the Registry of Guitar Tutors and has long been passionate about sharing guitar techniques with his students.

"Teaching and passing on knowledge is something that has been close to my heart for many years. I have taught in schools, conducted guitar workshops, written columns for various guitar publications, and as already mentioned, have a strong association with the RGT. I was asked to be a patron quite a few years ago. They are bringing out a book of my pieces under the umbrella of The London College of Music. As a self-taught, non-academic musician I'm honoured to now become 'legit' within the hallowed portals of the college with this new publication entitled GRADED GILTRAP. The title itself just makes me smile."

On 31 January 2018, Giltrap learnt the devastating news that Jamie, his son, had died suddenly after a short illness. He was not considered to be in danger and so this was very unexpected news. Jamie had followed in his father's footsteps with regard to a keen interest in music but his interests were of a very different genre. He had begun working as a DJ with dance music using the name DJ Tango. He was well respected and according to one source:

"changed the rave music scene and produced some amazing music, ... (helping to) shape and build the foundations for drum & bass in the days when Coventry was at the forefront of the best all-night rave clubs in the UK every weekend. Thousands traveled from all over the UK to queue for hours to get in. For those who had pleasure to know him or go to one of his sets, it was always a good night."

In order to help overcome his grief, Giltrap threw himself into other projects. One most dear to his own heart was an album he was working on at the time of Jamie's passing. It had been conceived to help to raise funds for Queen Elizabeth Hospital in Birmingham where Giltrap himself had been treated. This was his way of saying thank you for the wonderful treatment he had received at the hospital and to the many friends he had made there. Entitled Heartsongs, the album, a revised release of Shining Morn, included his all-star version of "Heartsong". The album is available for purchase only through the hospital charity and all proceeds are diverted towards cancer research. The story surrounding its production is detailed on Giltrap's website which includes a link to purchase a copy. The album is dedicated to Jamie's memory.

Another project which came to fruition around the time of Jamie's passing was the publication of Giltrap's authorised biography by Steve Pilkington. The foreword was written by Del Newman. The book was published on 5 October 2018 and is dedicated to Jamie's memory.

During his years in the music business, Giltrap has attracted admiration from other celebrities, one such being Pete Townshend of the Who. Giltrap has always cited Townshend as being a strong influence on his guitar playing. In a 2019 interview, he stated:

"There truly is only one (person I'd like to collaborate with) and that has to be Pete Townshend, not just because he is cited as an influence on the way I play the guitar, but the power and eloquence of his creativity. He really is a towering genius within the annals of rock music and for me the Who were and still are the greatest rock band ever. I had the great pleasure of meeting Pete for the first time in 2017 and a more gracious and generous man you couldn't wish to be with. When I was going through serious health problems, he gifted me one of his Gibson J-200 signature guitars, and we hadn't even met at that time. Brian May did a similar thing to help raise my spirits. I shall never forget both those acts of kindness."

To his delight, Giltrap and Townshend finally met at a Who concert in Birmingham's Barclaycard Arena in 2017 and he was delighted to be asked to play on a Who album Townshend was working on. The piece he was asked to contribute to was entitled "She Rocked My World", and Giltrap travelled to Townshend's home to record it. The resultant album, Who, was released on 6 December 2019.

Giltrap has continued to tour the UK playing smaller, more intimate venues occasionally supported by Nick Hooper or Carrie Martin. He collaborated on two tracks from Martin's 2020 album Entity: "Time after Time" and "White Kites".

=== 2020s ===
During the COVID-19 pandemic, according to his website, Giltrap remained creative in the period of restriction. No longer having to concentrate on his performances, he has been busy composing pieces for new albums, using musicians such as Ian Mosley and Rod Edwards. In November 2020, he promoted the release of a Christmas song for University Hospitals Birmingham Charity he had helped produce, penned by his friend Carrie Martin and recorded by a choir of hospital staff before the pandemic

On 31 January 2020, Giltrap released the album Woman. This was inspired by the many women who had influenced Giltrap during his life, particularly his wife, Hilary. It is her photograph which graces the album's cover. Many of the tracks were commissions from husbands dedicated to their wives.

== Personal life ==
Giltrap married his first wife Maureen in June 1970, and they had two children. His son, Jamie, who was a drum and bass pioneer and went by the name DJ Tango, died on 31 January 2018.

The couple divorced in 1981. Giltrap married his second wife, Hilary, on 22 May 1986. Hilary died on 30 December 2022, aged 83.

== Influences ==
Giltrap cites Hank Marvin, the Beatles, Pete Townshend, Donovan, Bert Jansch, John Renbourn, Julian Bream, John Williams, Edward Elgar and Ralph Vaughan Williams as his main musical influences.

== Awards and honours ==
In 2000, Giltrap was inducted into the Grand Order of Water Rats, a celebrity charitable organisation.

In 2019, Giltrap was appointed a Member of the Order of the British Empire (MBE) "for services to music and to charity". His award was announced in the 2018 honours list and the medal was presented to him by Prince Charles on 7 March 2019.

== Discography ==
Studio albums:

- 1968: Gordon Giltrap (Transatlantic Records) - later reissued on cassette as The Early Days (Allegro ALC) with a different track sequence
- 1969: Portrait (Transatlantic)
- 1971: A Testament of Time (MCA Records)
- 1973: Giltrap (Philips Records)
- 1976: Visionary (The Electric Record Company, catalogue no. TRIX 2)
- 1977: Perilous Journey (The Electric Record Company, catalogue no. TRIX 4)
- 1978: Fear of the Dark (The Electric Record Company)
- 1979: The Peacock Party (PVK)
- 1981 A Matter of Time - with Martin Taylor
- 1982: Airwaves (PVK)
- 1984: In At The Deep End (KPM)
- 1987: Elegy (Filmtrax) - reissued in 2000 by La Cooka Ratcha
- 1987: A Midnight Clear (Modern Music) - a collection of Christmas carols
- 1995: Music for the Small Screen (Munchkin)
- 1998: Troubadour (K-tel)
- 1989 One to One - with Rick Sanders
- 1998: Down the River (K-tel)
- 2002: Under This Blue Sky (La Cooka Ratcha)
- 2003: Remember This (La Cooka Ratcha) - primarily cover songs
- 2004: Drifter (La Cooka Ratcha)
- 2007: Secret Valentine (La Cooka Ratcha / Voiceprint)
- 2009 Double Vision - with Raymond Burley
- 2010: Shining Morn (Floating World)
- 2011: 4 Parts Guitar with Raymond Burley, John Etheridge and Clive Carroll
- 2012: Echoes Of Heaven with Carol Lee Sampson and Martin Green (BigWeb Entertainment Limited BW 4207)
- 2013 Ravens And Lullabies with Oliver Wakeman, Paul Manzi, Benoit David, Steve Amadeo and Johanne James (Esoteric Antenna / Cherry Red Records EANTCD1013)
- 2018 Heartsongs Charity CD for Birmingham Hospitals (Psychotron Records PR1007)
- 2020 Woman (Angel Air records SJPCD608)
