= MusicVR =

Virtual reality project by Mike Oldfield

MusicVR is a virtual reality project created and developed by the musician Mike Oldfield. To date it has produced two standalone simulation games and inspired content for some of Oldfield's albums. As of January 2010 Tubular.net hosts the free downloads of the two games.

== History ==
MusicVR set out to be a real-time virtual reality experience combining imagery and music, as a non-violent and essentially a non-goal driven game. In the early 1990s when Oldfield first wanted to create this world, the computers required to render the quality of images he wanted were large and vastly expensive. This prevented the early versions of the game from being released to the public, and although Oldfield had toyed with the idea of touring the game with his own powerful computer, this never happened. It was not just the graphical demands that were restrictive, but also the idea that the game should have 'freedom' and not be restricted to one path.

In 1994, Oldfield's album The Songs of Distant Earth, one of the first enhanced CDs, featured a 3D interactive segment, with some ideas similar to MusicVR. This content only works on Apple Mac OS 9 and earlier. Music Virtual Reality (MusicVR) was previously called Sonic Reality and Sonic VR during its development stages.

By the 2000s, as home computers had grown in complexity and capabilities, this earlier problem was mostly erased. Oldfield and his team of programmers set off developing a version of the MusicVR game for release to the public. Because the nature and idea of MusicVR was so different from many of today's games, they felt that they could not use an existing game engine. They developed their own, with Oldfield's creative control of the project deciding its look and feel at each step.

The game was developed on and for Windows based PCs, although Oldfield uses Apple Macintosh computers for recording much of his music.

== Tres Lunas ==
The first publicly released MusicVR game was called Tres Lunas. It contained specially composed music as well as pieces from the album of the same name.

== Maestro ==
The second MusicVR game was called Maestro. It contained specially composed music as well as pieces from Tubular Bells 2003 album.

== See also ==
- Xplora1: Peter Gabriel's Secret World - A similar interactive software project by Peter Gabriel from 1993
