= The Village Thing =

- Parent company: Saydisc
- Founded: 1970
- Founder: Ian A. Anderson
- Distributor(s): Transatlantic Records
- Genre: guitar-oriented, singer-songwriter, folk, blues
- Country of origin: United Kingdom
- Location: Badminton, Gloucestershire

The Village Thing was an independent record label in the United Kingdom which published folk rock, blues and acoustic music between 1970 and 1973, under the tag of "The Alternative Folk Label".

== History ==
The company, based at The Barton, Inglestone Common, Badminton, Gloucestershire, rose from the thriving Bristol contemporary folk scene based around the Clifton area and centred on the Bristol Troubadour Club. Specialising in local acts, it took the music to a wider audience and was highly influential in the development of British folk and blues based music in the 1970s and after. Records were pressed in relatively small numbers and a cult following has resulted in them becoming highly collectable. Typical pressings were about 2,000 copies, but their best seller, "The Folker" by Fred Wedlock sold some 20,000. Village Thing was founded by Gef Lucena, Ian A. Anderson and John Turner. Lucena was already running a local indie label, Saydisc, which had already gained a reputation for publishing low-run pressings by local folk/comedy artists including Fred Wedlock; Saydisc was the "parent" company and continues to trade today. Anderson had become well known for his part in the "White Blues Boom" of the late 1960s and had recorded for Fontana both solo and with Mike Cooper. turn, The Pigsty Hill Light Orchestra. Village Thing records were distributed by Transatlantic Records. The company logo was design ed by Rodney Matthews, as were some of the album covers; Matthews later became very well known for his fantasy art and produced album covers for major artists including Thin Lizzy, Magnum and Rick Wakeman.

== Availability ==
Some of The Village Thing albums have been reissued as CDs on labels including Scenesof (US); Castle, The Weekend Beatnik, Saydisc and Sunbeam (UK); Riverman (Korea); and Vinyl Japan.

== Discography ==
=== Albums (12 inch vinyl) ===
- VTS 1 Phlop! Pigsty Hill Light Orchestra
- VTS 2 The Sun Also Rises, The Sun Also Rises
- VTS 3 Royal York Crescent, Ian A. Anderson
- VTS 4 The Legendary Me, Wizz Jones
- VTS 5 An Acoustic Confusion, Steve Tilston
- VTS 6 The Words in Between, Dave Evans
- VTS 7 The Folker, Fred Wedlock
- VTS 8 Piggery Jokery, Pigsty Hill Light Orchestra
- VTS 9 A Vulture Is Not A Bird You Can Trust, Ian A. Anderson
- VTS 10 Mudge And Clutterbuck, Mudge And Clutterbuck (unreleased)
- VTS 11 Magic Landscape, Hunt and Turner
- VTS 12 Hokum, Tight Like That
- VTS 13 Tucker Zimmerman, Tucker Zimmerman
- VTS 14 Elephantasia, Dave Evans
- VTSAM 15 Us (Various artist)
- VTSAM 16 Matchbox Days (Various artists)
- VTS 17 Feelin' Fine, Derroll Adams
- VTS 18 Singer Sleeps on As Blaze Rages, Ian A. Anderson
- VTS 19 Jonesville, Al Jones
- VTS 20 Frollicks, Fred Wedlock
- VTS 21 Chris Thompson, Chris Thompson
- VTS 22 Peabody Hotel, Dave Peabody
- VTS 23 Junk Store Songs For Sale, Lackey and Sweeney
- VTS 24 When I Leave Berlin, Wizz Jones
- VTS 25 Murf, Noel Murphy

=== Singles / Extended Play (7 inch vinyl) ===
- VTSX 1000 "The Great White Dap" EP – Various Artists (Wizz Jones/The Sun Also Rises/Ian A. Anderson/Pigsty Hill Light Orchestra)
- VTSX 1001 "Cut Across Shorty / Shake That Thing" – Strange Fruit
- VTSX 1002 "One More Chance / Policeman’s Ball" – Ian A. Anderson

VTS7, VTS17 and VTS18 were also released on cassette and 8-track cartridge
