= The Legendary Me =

Studio album by Wizz Jones
- Released: November 1970
- Recorded: 1970
- Studio: Bristol Troubadour
- Genre: Folk, folk rock
- Length: 54:30
- Label: The Village Thing / Sunbeam
- Producer: Ian A. Anderson, John Turner

Wizz Jones chronology
Wizz Jones (1969)	The Legendary Me (1970)	Right Now (1972)

Professional ratings
Review scores
Source	Rating
Allmusic	4.5/5 stars

The Legendary Me is the 1970 album by the pioneer British folk musician Wizz Jones. The album contains eight cover tunes written by songwriter and Jones' friend Alan Tunbridge. Sunbeam Records has reissued this album on vinyl (catalogue number SBRLP 5015) and on CD (with additional tracks) (catalogue number SBRCD 5015).

== Track listing ==
All tracks composed by Alan Tunbridge; except where indicated

1. "See How the Time is Flying" – 3:26
2. "Willie Moore" (Traditional) – 4:22
3. "The Legendary Me" – 5:21
4. "When I Cease to Care" – 4:17
5. "Nobody Told You So" – 5:17
6. "Beggar Man" – 4:46
7. "Keep Your Lamp Trimmed and Burning" (Reverend Gary Davis) – 3:00
8. "Dazzling Stranger" – 3:04
9. "If I'd Only Known" (Wizz Jones) – 2:21
10. "Slow Down to My Speed" – 3:08
11. "Stick a Little Label on It" – 3:49

== Bonus tracks (included on 2006 CD release) ==
1. "Sisters of Mercy" (Leonard Cohen) – 4:21
2. "Glory of Love" (Billy Hill) – 2:49
3. "Needle of Death" (Bert Jansch) – 4:29

== Personnel ==
- Wizz Jones – acoustic guitar, vocals
- John Turner – bass
- Pete Berryman – guitar on "See How the Time is Flying" and "Beggarman"
- Ralph McTell – harmonium on "Dazzling Stranger", electric guitar on "When I Cease to Care"
- Reanna James – piano on "Slow Down to My Speed"

== Production ==
- Producer: Ian A. Anderson, John Turner
- Recording Engineer: Gef Lucena, Ron Geesin
- Jude Holmes, Steven Carr – executive producer
