= Ian A. Anderson =

English magazine editor, folk musician and broadcaster

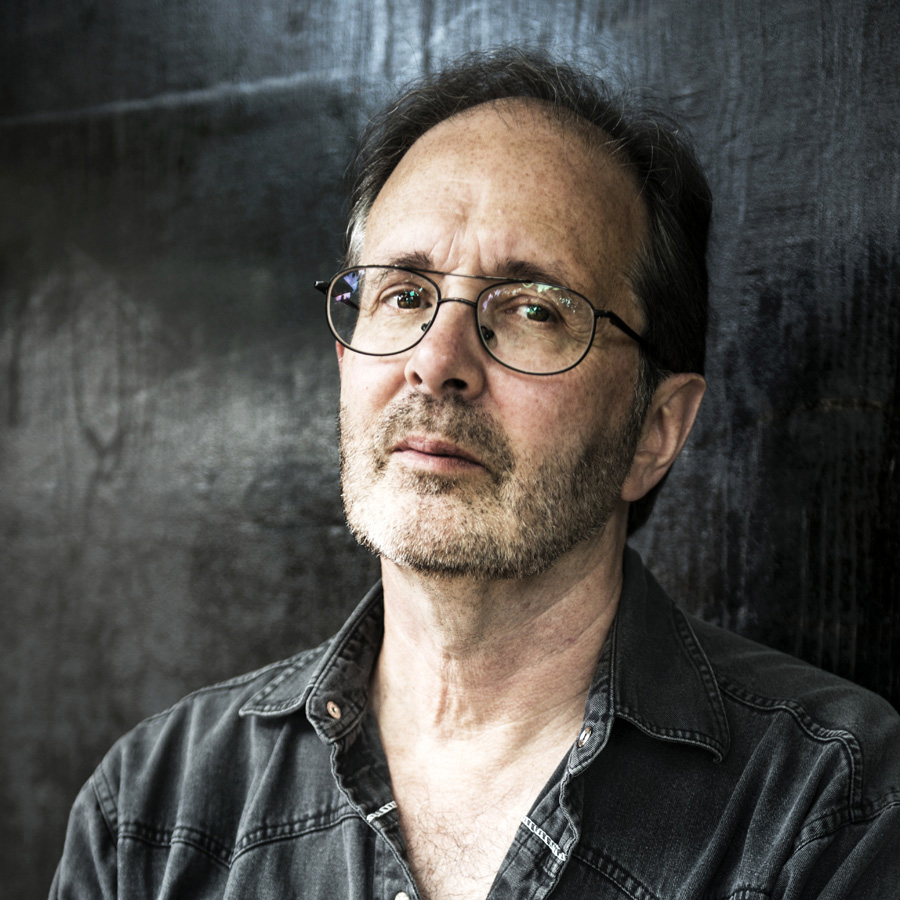

Background information
- Born: 26 July 1947 (age 79); Weston-super-Mare, England
- Genres: Folk music; blues; world music
- Occupations: Magazine editor; folk musician; broadcaster; event producer
- Years active: 1960s–present
- Website: ianaanderson.com

Ian A. Anderson (born 26 July 1947) is an English magazine editor, folk musician and broadcaster.

== Early career and The Village Thing ==
Anderson first performed in his home town of Weston-super-Mare as a member of the Backwater Jook Band and came to prominence as a member of the Bristol based country blues scene of the mid to late 1960s, performing live and on record, both solo, with Al Jones and Elliott Jackson as the trio "Anderson Jones Jackson", and as a duo with Mike Cooper. The middle initial was added at a later date to avoid confusion with Ian Anderson of the band Jethro Tull.

After two EPs, he recorded his first album, Stereo Death Breakdown, as Ian Anderson’s Country Blues Band, which was released by Liberty/United Artists in 1969.

In December 1969, with John Turner, he conceived the record label The Village Thing, for which he was also a producer. The label released two dozen albums by mostly British and American artists between 1970 and 1974 including LPs by Wizz Jones, Sun Also Rises, Pigsty Hill Light Orchestra, Steve Tilston, Dave Evans, Fred Wedlock, Al Jones, Derroll Adams, Hunt & Turner, Lackey & Sweeney, Chris Thompson, Dave Peabody and Noel Murphy, as well as three by Anderson himself.

In the 21st century, much of Village Thing’s output has been categorised as "psych folk" or "acid folk", terms which did not exist at the time its records were first made.

== 1970s–80s duo ==
In 1973, he moved from Bristol to Farnham, Surrey, performing internationally with his then wife, Maggie Holland, as the duo Hot Vultures who recorded three albums. In 1980, the duo teamed up with melodeon player Rod Stradling and hammered dulcimer player Sue Harris, later replaced by Chris Coe, as The English Country Blues Band (two albums). This line-up subsequently expanded again with the addition of guitarist Jon Moore, drummer John Maxwell and later keyboard player Ian Carter and guitarist Ben Mandelson to become the world music-influenced English ceilidh band Tiger Moth, later, Orchestre Super Moth when they recorded with international guest musicians (two LPs, and two 12” EPs).

== Event and tour organisation ==
Anderson organised the Folk Blues Bristol & West club in Bristol (1967–1969), England's first specialist country blues club outside London. In 1982, he founded Farnham Folk Day, an annual event at Farnham Maltings which ran until 1988. He directed the 1987–1989 Bracknell Folk & Roots Festivals at South Hill Park, Bracknell, the Europe In Union concert series at London’s Union Chapel (2003–4) and has curated many single events including English Roots Against Apartheid (Town & Country Club, London, 1987), Ceilidh Aid (The Forum, London, 2005), Roots At The Roundhouse (Roundhouse, London, 2010), Ghosts From The Basement (Cecil Sharp House, London, 2010), Looking For A New England (Cecil Sharp House, London, 2010), Bridges (Queen Elizabeth Hall, London, 2014), Bob Copper Centenary Celebration (Cecil Sharp House, London, 2015), No Voices (Kings Place, London, 2016) and the Bristol Troubadour 50th Anniversary celebrations (St Georges, Bristol, 2016).

He organised UK tours for other artists including Mississippi Fred McDowell (1969), Derroll Adams (1972), Spider John Koerner (1980 and 2010), Dembo Konte & Kausu Kuyateh (1986–1989), Tarika (1990s) and Athena (2005–6) as well as acting as agent for other folk and world music artists via his Village Thing agency (Bristol, 1970–1973) and Folk Music Services (Farnham, 1982–1989).

== fRoots ==
In the 1960s and 1970s, Anderson regularly contributed as a freelance writer to publications including Blues Unlimited, the Western Daily Press, Melody Maker, Folk Review and Folk Scene. In 1979, he co-founded The Southern Rag, a local quarterly folk music magazine for the south of England. By 1984, it had become so popular that Anderson converted into a glossy monthly magazine with news stand distribution, under the new title, Folk Roots. Anderson moved its offices to London in 1988 and the magazine became well-known, not only for its authoritative writing and outspokenness. but for its campaigning for wider acceptance of both British folk music and world music. In 1999, its title was abbreviated to fRoots.

Anderson and Folk Roots were actively involved in the 1987 campaign which established the term "world music", and supported tours by artists who were previously unknown in the UK. In 2001, he developed the Awards For World Music, which were produced and run by BBC Radio 3 from 2002 to 2008.

fRoots was given the WOMEX Award for professional excellence in 2010.

== Rogue Records ==
As a spin-off from his 1980s activities, he founded an independent record label, Rogue Records, which provided a platform for both his own bands and new artists, concentrating on world music. The label was the first to release recordings in the UK by Senegal's Baaba Maal, Madagascar's Tarika, Gambian kora duo Dembo Konte and Kausu Kuyateh, and Tex-Mex accordionist Flaco Jimenez. Rogue Records later turned into a compilation label, The Weekend Beatnik, which specialised in the reissue of folk and world music albums in CD format.

== Broadcasting ==
Anderson presented a weekly folk, roots and world music show on Guildford ILR station County Sound in the mid 1980s, a weekly folk show on the BBC World Service for 12 years from 1987, the occasional series for BBC Radio 2, and a world music program World Routes on London’s Jazz FM. He has also broadcast on BBC Radio 1, BBC Radio 3, BBC Radio 4 and Capital Radio. Since 2002, he has hosted fRoots Radio on the web. In 2023, he joined community station Cambridge 105 Radio, where he presents a monthly show.

== Recent music career ==
In 2008/2009, he was one third of Blue Blokes 3, with Lu Edmonds (formerly of the Mekons, Billy Bragg's Blokes, 3 Mustaphas 3, the Damned, PiL and others) on vocals, cumbus, saz and guitar, and Ben Mandelson (Billy Bragg’s Blokes, 3 Mustaphas 3, Tiger Moth, Yiddish Twist Orchestra and others) on vocals, mandolin, baritone bouzouki, banjo, tenor guitar, etc. After Edmonds re-joined Public Image Limited in 2010, Anderson and Mandelson continued as the duo The False Beards who released their first album in 2013. In 2016, Anderson and Holland got together again for a Hot Vultures reunion tour, and in 2017 he commenced doing solo gigs again for the first time since 1973.

He released an album of new and completely solo recordings in 2017, then in January 2019 the compilation Onwards!, which was sourced from 50 years of his solo work and all the bands he has been part of (including previously unissued material).

In 2024, Anderson compiled and wrote the sleeve notes for Les Cousins: The Soundtrack Of Soho’s Legendary Folk & Blues Club, a three-CD box set featuring various artists from the Soho club, Les Cousins.

== Discography ==
=== Albums ===
- The Inverted World – Saydisc (1968)
- Stereo Death Breakdown – Liberty (1969) (Note: as Ian Anderson's Country Blues Band)
- Book Of Changes – Fontana (1970) (Note: with Mike Cooper)
- Royal York Crescent – The Village Thing (1970)
- A Vulture Is Not A Bird You Can Trust – The Village Thing (1971)
- Singer Sleeps On as Blaze Rages – The Village Thing (1972)
- Carrion On – EMI Bestseller/Red Rag (1975) (Note: with Maggie Holland, as Hot Vultures)
- The East Street Shakes – Red Rag (1977)
- Up The Line – Plant Life (1979)
- No Rules – Dingles (1982) (Note: As a member of the English Country Blues Band)
- Home and Deranged – Rogue (1983)
- Tiger Moth – Rogue (1984) (Note: As a member of Tiger Moth)
- The Continuous Preaching Blues – Appaloosa (1984)
- Howling Moth – Rogue (1988)
- Stubble – Fledg'ling (2008) (Note: As a member of Blue Blokes 3)
- Ankle – Ghosts From The Basement (2013)

=== Singles and EPs ===
- Anderson Jones Jackson – Saydisc (1966)
- Almost The Country Blues – Saydisc (1967)
- Salt of The Earth (Song Of Praise) – Rogue (1988)
- The World At Sixes And Sevens – Rogue (1989)
