= When I Leave Berlin =

Studio album by Wizz Jones
- Released: 1973
- Recorded: 1973
- Genre: Folk, folk rock
- Length: 38:03
- Label: Village Thing
- Producer: Ian A. Anderson

Wizz Jones chronology
| Winter Song (1973) | When I Leave Berlin (1973) | Soloflight (1974) |

When I Leave Berlin is the 1973 album by the pioneer British folk musician Wizz Jones. Wizz was accompanied on some of the songs by his future group "Lazy Farmer", and Bert Jansch played guitar on "Freudian Slip". The album was remastered and released on CD by Sunbeam Records in 2007, also included as bonus tracks were the six songs from his 1973 EP Winter Song.

The title track was also covered in concert by Bruce Springsteen and the E Street Band on 30 May 2012 in Berlin.

== Track listing ==
1. "Living Alone" (Wizz Jones) - 2:39
2. "Pastures of Plenty" (Woody Guthrie) - 3:38
3. "First Girl I Loved" (Robin Williamson) - 6:59
4. "She's Only Waiting" (Wizz Jones) - 2:38
5. "Cluck Old Hen" (Traditional) - 3:20
6. "When I Leave Berlin" (Wizz Jones) - 3:18
7. "Frankie" (Mississippi John Hurt) - 3:06
8. "Skip Rope Song" (Jesse Winchester) - 3:56
9. "Winter Song" (Alan Hull) - 4:03
10. "Freudian Slip" (Wizz Jones) - 4:26

=== Bonus tracks (included on 2007 CD release) ===
1. "When You're Gone" (Alan Tunbridge) - 2:40
2. "Come Back Baby" (Lightnin' Hopkins) - 3:30
3. "Cocaine Blues" (Rev. Gary Davis) - 3:10
4. "Frankie" (Mississippi John Hurt) - 2:40
5. "Guitar Shuffle" (Big Bill Broonzy) - 1:55
6. "Winter Song" (Alan Hull) - 4:05

== Personnel ==
- Wizz Jones - acoustic guitar, vocals
- Sandy Jones - banjo
- Jake Walton - guitar, dulcimer, background vocals
- John Bidwell - flute, background vocals
- Don Cogin - banjo

== Production ==
- Producer: Ian A. Anderson
- Recording Engineer: Ian A. Anderson
- Sleeve Design: Terence Brace
- Photography: Ralph Clement
