= Winter Song (EP) =

EP by Wizz Jones
- Released: 1974
- Recorded: 1972
- Genres: Folk, folk rock
- Length: 18:00
- Label: Autogram Records
- Producer: Wizz Jones

Wizz Jones chronology
Right Now (1972)	Winter Song (1974)	When I Leave Berlin (1975)

Winter Song is the 1974 EP by the pioneer British folk musician Wizz Jones. The songs were recorded on a tape recorder at concert promoter Willy Schwenken's house in Nottuln, Germany circa 1972. The first time it was issued was in 1974. The recordings also came as a bonus EP, but with a different catalogue number, with the Double Album Soloflight, and in 2007 were included as bonus tracks on the remastered CD release of When I Leave Berlin.

== Track listing ==
1. "When You're Gone" (Alan Tunbridge) - 2:40
2. "Come Back Baby" (Lightnin' Hopkins) - 3:30
3. "Cocaine Blues" (Rev. Gary Davis) - 3:10
4. "Frankie" (Mississippi John Hurt) - 2:40
5. "Guitar Shuffle" (Big Bill Broonzy) - 1:55
6. "Winter Song" (Alan Hull) - 4:05

== Personnel ==
- Wizz Jones - guitar, vocals

== Production ==
- Producer: Wizz Jones
- Recording Engineer: Willy Schwenken/Wizz Jones
- Mixing: n/a
- Photography: unknown
