= Al Jones (English musician) =

English folk and blues songwriter, guitarist and singer

Alun Ashworth-Jones
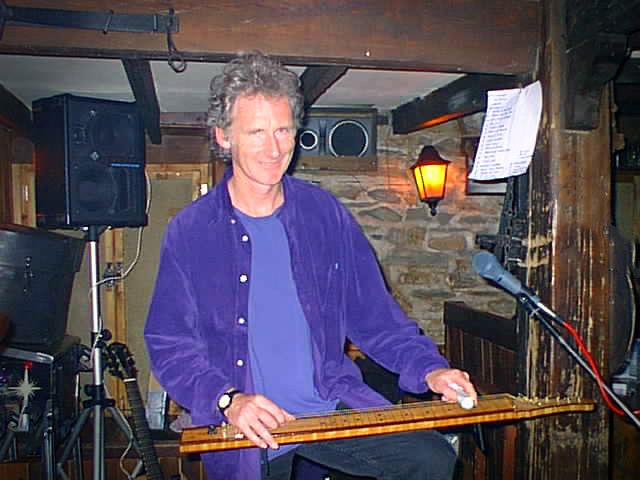
- Al Jones in 1998

Background information
- Also known as: Al Jones
- Born: 31 October 1945; Saffron Walden, Essex, England
- Died: 1 June 2008 (aged 62)
- Genres: Folk, blues, folk rock
- Occupations: Songwriter, guitarist, singer
- Instruments: Guitar, vocals
- Years active: 1960s–2008

Alun Ashworth-Jones (31 October 1945 – 1 June 2008), known as Al Jones, was an influential English folk and blues songwriter, guitarist and singer, noted for his distinctive and original folk-rock guitar style and his often darkly humorous lyrics.

== Early career ==
He first came to prominence in the Bristol folk scene in the mid-1960s, where he formed a trio with harmonica player Elliot Jackson and singer/guitarist Ian A. Anderson. They were resident performers at the Bristol Troubadour Club and frequently played at Les Cousins in London. Jones' recording debut was as part of that trio on an EP in 1966. He moved to London in 1968/1969 and featured on "Matchbox Days", an early Village Thing compilation of tracks by the white British "Blues Boom" artists of that period, alongside Jo-Ann Kelly, John James, Mike Cooper and Dave Kelly. He made an album before moving to Devon, then later to Cornwall. Anderson persuaded him to make a further album in 1972, "Jonesville", which featured a very early Rodney Matthews cover. Jones' reputation gained cult status in Britain and abroad, his albums becoming highly sought-after, and he occasionally emerged to play gigs in Europe, particularly Belgium and Germany, where he had a particularly dedicated following.

== Instrument making ==
His main business became the manufacture of his Ashworth range of instrument pick-ups and he later joined with Nigel Thornbory, the guitar maker, to produce the silicone rubber-stringed Ashbory bass, which is the only British instrument ever licensed to Fender; it is no longer in production.

== Re-emergence from obscurity ==
Colin Irwin, in fRoots magazine in 1998 wrote about Jones: "In 1991 he had a call from a friend who wanted to put on a concert, and couldn't believe it when he found himself agreeing to appear. 'I couldn't play anything at first, it had been such a long time and my fingertips had gone soft.' But on a business trip to London he got his hands on a Strat and it felt so good he couldn't put it down. Gradually he eased back into gigging and sitting in with any damn band that passed by. 'People like Wizz Jones and John Renbourn would come down and I'd play guitar with them. I remember John playing something and it sounded familiar and I said 'John I know that one!' He said 'you should…you wrote it!' He started writing again. Prolifically. Got a new acoustic guitar. And ultimately he came to record a brand new CD, Swimming Pool' in 1998.

His gigs at that time were mainly in Cornwall and he rarely travelled beyond the Duchy's boundary.

In 2000, Jones recorded "A little bit of Heaven" under the band name Blues De-luxe, with fellow Cornish musician and long term friend Pete Flaskett. The album consisted of a selection of songs from the album Swimming pool as well as some new material written by Jones and Flaskett. Blues De-luxe took part in festivals and gigs around Cornwall for several years.

In 2001, Mooncrest Records reissued Alun Ashworth-Jones as a double CD with numerous, previously unissued, "bonus" tracks including live recordings from April 1969 with a full electric band, and five acoustic tracks recorded in 1971.

His early works were reissued in 2007 on the Castle Records label as a double CD, All My Friends Are Back Again.

Jones died suddenly and unexpectedly on 1 June 2008 at the age of 62.

== Discography ==
- Anderson, Jones, Jackson (Saydisc 33SD 125 – 5 track EP, 1966)
- Alun Ashworth-Jones (Parlophone, 1969)
- Jonesville (The Village Thing, 1972)
- Swimming Pool (Weekend Beatnik, 1998)
- Alun Ashworth-Jones (reissue by Mooncrest Records with many previously unissued "bonus" tracks, 2001)
- All My Friends Are Back Again (compilation of Alun Ashworth-Jones, Jonesville and additional tracks (Mooncrest, 2007)

=== Tracks on compilations ===
- Matchbox Days (The Village Thing, 1972) – "Searchin' the Desert"(*)
- 49 Greek Street (RCA Records SF8118, 1970) (**)

(*) reissued on Ace Records (UK) Big Beat label, catalogue number CDWIKD 168, in 1997
(**) tracks also available as bonus tracks on 2001 CD reissue of "Alun Ashworth-Jones"
