= Right Now (Wizz Jones album) =

Studio album by Wizz Jones
- Released: 1972
- Recorded: 1972
- Genre: Folk, folk rock
- Length: 43:42
- Label: CBS
- Producer: John Renbourn

Wizz Jones chronology
The Legendary Me (1970)	Right Now (1972)	Winter Song (1973)

Professional ratings
Review scores
Source	Rating
Allmusic	4.5/5 stars

Right Now is the 1972 album by the pioneer British folk musician Wizz Jones. The album was produced by John Renbourn, who also played sitar and harmonica on the album.

The album was re-released on CD in 1999 on the Columbia label and on vinyl in 2011 by Germany's Speaker's Corner label.

== Track listing ==
1. "Which of Them You Love the Best" (Alan Tunbridge) - 5:04
2. "One Grain of Sand" (Pete Seeger) - 3:36
3. "City of the Angels" (Alan Tunbridge) - 6:06
4. "The Raven" (Wizz Jones, Alan Tunbridge) - 3:54
5. "Right Now" (Traditional; arranged by Wizz Jones) - 4:04
6. "Find a Man for You Girl" (Alan Tunbridge) - 3:40
7. "American Land" (Traditional; arranged by Peggy Seeger) - 4:01
8. "No More Time to Try" (Wizz Jones) - 2:42
9. "Mary Go 'Round" (Alan Tunbridge) - 6:46
10. "Deep Water" (Wizz Jones, Alan Tunbridge) - 3:49

== Personnel ==
- Wizz Jones - vocals and acoustic guitar
- Sandy Jones - banjo
- Pete Berryman - acoustic and electric guitar
- Reanna Sutcliffe - piano, harpsichord and vocals
- Ian Hoyle - drums
- Malcolm Pool - bass
- John Renbourn - sitar and harmonica
- Sue Draheim - fiddle
- Andy Fernbach - piano

=== Production ===
- Producer: John Renbourn for Jo Lustig (Isle of Man) Limited
- Recording Engineer: Colin Caldwell
- Recorded at: Marquee Studios, London
- Photography: Alessandro Visinoni
