= Late Nights and Long Days =

- Cover for reissue "More Late Nights and Long Days"

Studio album by Wizz Jones & Simeon Jones
- Released: 1993
- Recorded: 1993
- Genre: Folk, folk rock
- Label: Fellside Records
- Producer: Unknown

Wizz Jones & Simeon Jones chronology
Live in Dublin (1991)	Late Nights and Long Days (1993)	Dazzling Stranger (1995)

Late Nights and Long Days is a 1993-CD album by the noted British folk musician Wizz Jones and his son, Simeon Jones. The album was recorded at Airwave Studios, London in 1989 (tracks 1, 3, 4, 7, 9, 10 and 11) and Metcalfe Studios, London in 1992 (remaining tracks). The CD was reissued circa 2008 on Jones' private Wizzydisc label, with 2 "bonus" tracks, as More Late Nights and Long Days

== Track listing ==
1. "Black Dog (Jesse Winchester)"
2. "Nathaniel" (Wizz Jones)
3. "Night Ferry" (Wizz Jones)
4. "Keep Your Lamp Trimmed and Burning (trad/Reverend Gary Davis)
5. "Two Hundred Miles Away" (Wizz Jones)
6. "Magical Flight" (Alan Tunbridge)
7. "Massacre at Beziers" (Alan Tunbridge)
8. "Mother It's Me" (Wizz Jones)
9. "Cannot Keep From Crying Sometimes" (trad/Davey Graham)
10. "Fresh as a Sweet Sunday Morning" (Bert Jansch)
11. "You Can Count On Me To Do My Part" (Mose Allison)

=== Bonus tracks on "More Late Nights and Long Days" ===
1. "The Grapes of Life"
2. "Young Fashioned Ways"

== Personnel ==
- Wizz Jones - acoustic guitar, lead vocals
- Simeon Jones - flute, harmonica, tenor saxophone
- John Bentley - bass guitar (tracks 10 and 11)
- Justin Hildreth - drums (track 11)
- John Renbourn - acoustic guitar and vocal (track 3)

== Production ==
- Mixdown and digital mastering: Keith at Offbeat Studios, London (tracks 1, 3, 4, 7, 9, 10 and 11); Tony at Spark Studios, London (remaining tracks)
- Digital production master: H-J Maucksch at Pauler Acoustics, Northeim, Germany
- Photography: Andy Ebsworth
- Liner Notes: none
