= Bristol Troubadour Club =

Defunct folk music club in Bristol, England

The Bristol Troubadour Club was a short-lived but influential club in the thriving contemporary folk music scene in Bristol in the late 1960s and early 1970s, It was located in Clifton village, the student quarter above the city centre. The club was considered by some as the liveliest and most creative outside London.

The club hosted some of the premier folk artists of the day, including Al Jones, Fred Wedlock, Pigsty Hill Light Orchestra, Ian Anderson, Mike Cooper, John Renbourn, Bert Jansch, The Incredible String Band and Roy Harper. Al Stewart had a residency there, and mentions the club in his song "Clifton in the Rain".

== History ==
The Troubadour was opened in Waterloo Street, Clifton, by a returning Australian emigree, Ray Willmott, on Friday 7 October 1966. The first act to play there was Anderson Jones Jackson (Ian Anderson, Al Jones and Elliott Jackson). Other regular performers included the Guyanese calypso singer Norman Beaton and the actor Chris Langham who performed as "Wizz" Langham (inspired, no doubt, by Wizz Jones). From 1967, the "Folk Blues Bristol and West" club, founded by Ian Anderson, met on the first Sunday of each month at the Troubadour but became so popular that it had to move to larger premises, firstly at The Old Duke in King Street and, later, to the Full Moon on Stokes Croft.

In 1967, Stewart mentioned the club in his track "Clifton in the Rain" from his first album "Bed Sitter Images":

And all along the way
Wanderers in overcoats with
Collars on parade
And steaming in the night
The listeners in the Troubadour
Guitar player weaves a willow strain
I took my love to Clifton in the rain

In 1971, the venue closed following the purchase of the premises by a Peter Bush, just after it advertised that it had gained a drinks licence (having been alcohol-free from its inception). Dave Berry wrote in Pre-View magazine that "the loss of the Troubadour can't just be assessed in terms of the weekly entertainment it provided. Above all, the club was a social centre - and an inspiration and springboard for countless young artists".

The club is held in such great affection by its former members and musicians that three Troubadour reunions have been held since 2000. The first took place at the QEH Theatre in Clifton on 9 November 2002 and featured many of the original artists. A double CD, Waterloo Street Revisited was issued the following year of recordings of the artists' performances. Because of its success, a similar concert was held on 6 March 2004 at the Redgrave Theatre, Clifton. The third reunion took place at St. George's Hall in Bristol on 8 October 2016, which marked the 50th anniversary of the club, which opened on 7 October, 1966. The following day, at midday, a blue plaque was unveiled in Waterloo Street commemorating both the club and the fact that the name Clifton Village was first used on publicity materials for the club.

== Bibliography ==
- Jones, Mark (2009). Bristol Folk. Bristol: Bristol Folk Publications. ISBN 978-0-9563531-0-8.

== Notes ==
51°27′18″N 2°37′13″W
