= Lucky the Man =

Studio album by Wizz Jones
- Released: 2001
- Recorded: 1998–2000
- Genre: Folk, folk rock
- Length: 46:10
- Label: Scenescof (USA), Hux
- Producer: Wizz Jones, Andy le Vien, Charles Reynolds

Wizz Jones chronology
Through the Fingers (2001)	Lucky the Man (2001)	Young Fashioned Ways (2004)

Alternative cover (extended reissue on Hux Records)
- Cover for "Lucky the Man" (extended reissue)

Lucky the Man is the 2001 studio album by the British folk guitarist, singer and songwriter Wizz Jones. The album was re-released on CD in 2007, with additional tracks, on the Hux label; this issue comes with a 12-page booklet including extensive notes, personal comments from Wizz on each of the bonus tracks, plus rare photographs from Jones' personal archive.

== Track listing ==
1. "Weeping Willow Blues" (Blind Boy Fuller)
2. "Sermonette" (Nat and Julian Adderley)
3. "Lucky the Man" (Wizz Jones)
4. "Paris" (Clive Palmer; arranged by Wizz Jones)
5. "Omie Wise "(Traditional; arranged by Wizz Jones)
6. "Mountain Rain" (Archie Fisher)
7. "In Stormy Weather" (Al Jones)
8. "Another Summertime" (Wizz Jones)
9. "Lullaby of Battersea" (Wizz Jones)
10. "Roving Cowboy (Ballad of Dan Moody)" (Mike Smith)
11. "Funny (But I Still Love You)" (Ray Charles)
12. "Blues Run the Game" (Jackson C. Frank)
13. "Would You Like to Take a Walk?" (Mort Dixon, Billy Rode, Harry Warren)

== Additional tracks on 2007 CD release ==
14. "About a Spoonful" (Mance Lipscomb)
15. "Dark Eyed Gypsies" (Traditional; arranged by Wizz Jones)
16. "Moving On Song" (Ewan MacColl)
17. "Planet Without a Plan" (Wizz Jones)
18. "Sugar for Sugar" (Rabbit Brown) (Note: with Ramblin' Jack Elliott, previously unissued)

== Personnel ==
- Wizz Jones - acoustic guitar, lead vocals
- John Renbourn - guitar, vocals
- Clive Palmer - 5-string banjo
- Jacqui McShee - vocals
- Gary Ricard - Godin electric guitar, vocals
- Gerry Conway - percussion
- Bernd Rest - Santa Cruz acoustic guitar
- Simeon Jones - harmonica, tenor saxophone
- Martin Wheatley - National Tricone tenor guitar, Martin mahogany ukulele
- Ramblin' Jack Elliott - guitar, vocals (2007 issue only)

== Label details ==
=== 2001 issue ===
- Label = Scenescof (USA)
- Catalogue # = SCOFCD1009 (CD); SCOFLP1009 (limited edition vinyl LP)

=== 2007 issue ===
- Label: Hux Records
- Catalogue # = HUX094
- ASIN: B000UUHOCW

== Production ==
- Producers: Wizz Jones, Andy le Vien, Charles Reynolds
- Recording Engineer: Andy le Vien
- Mixing: unknown
- Photography: Dave Peabody, Robert Wilbraham, Charles Reynolds, Simeon Jones
- Liner Notes: unknown
