= The Grapes of Life =

Studio album by Wizz Jones
- Released: 1987
- Genre: Folk, folk rock
- Label: Run River RR A005

Wizz Jones chronology
Roll on River (1981)	The Grapes of Life (1987)	Live In Dublin (1991)

The Grapes of Life is the 1987 studio album by the noted and influential British folk guitarist, singer and songwriter Wizz Jones.

== Track listing ==
1. "The Grapes of Life" (Alan Tunbridge)
2. "Happiness was Free" (Wizz Jones)
3. "Corrinne" (Blind Boy Fuller)
4. "Touch Has a Memory" (Pete Atkin, Clive James)
5. "Moving On Song" (Ewan MacColl)
6. "Needle of Death" (Bert Jansch)
7. "First Girl I Loved" (Robin Williamson)
8. "Do What You Please" (Steve Tilston)
9. " 'Bout a Spoonful" (Mance Lipscomb)
10. "Letter From West Germany" (Wizz Jones)
11. "Dark-eyed Gypsies" (Traditional via Davey Graham; arranged by Wizz Jones)
12. "Planet Without a Plan" (Wizz Jones)

== Label details ==
- Label = Run River
- Catalogue # = RR A005

== Production ==
- Recorded and Produced by Michael Klein at Heartbeat Sound, London.
