= Happiness Was Free =

Studio album by Wizz Jones
- Released: 1976
- Recorded: 1976
- Genre: Folk, folk rock
- Label: Intercord

Wizz Jones chronology
Lazy Farmer (1975)	Happiness Was Free (1976)	Magical Flight (1977)

Happiness Was Free is the 1976 album by the pioneer British Folk musician Wizz Jones. The standout tracks are "Propinquity", "Happiness Was Free", "Womankind" and "City of the Angels".

== Track listing ==
1. "Propinquity" (Michael Nesmith)
2. "Country Comfort" (Bernie Taupin, Elton John)
3. "Happiness Was Free" (Wizz Jones)
4. "Nathaniel" (Wizz Jones)
5. "Man with the Banjo" (Wizz Jones)
6. "Common or Garden Mystery" (Wizz Jones)
7. "Black Dog" (Jesse Winchester)
8. "Womankind" (Robin Williamson)
9. "Living Outside the Law" (Wizz Jones)
10. "City of the Angels" (Alan Tunbridge)

== Personnel ==
- Wizz Jones - guitar, vocals
- Pete Berryman - guitar
- Sandy Spencer - cello
- Rod Clements - bass

== Production ==
- Producer: Carsten Linde and Wizz Jones
- Recording Engineer: Conny Plank
- Mixing: Conny Plank
- Photography: Carsten Linde
