= Magical Flight =

Studio album by Wizz Jones
- Released: 1977
- Recorded: 1977
- Genre: Folk, folk rock
- Length: 36:41
- Label: Plant Life (UK);

Wizz Jones chronology
Happiness Was Free (1976)	Magical Flight (1977)	Letter from West Germany (197?)

Alternative cover (German issue)

Cover of the U.K. CD reissue, note changes to text from L.P. version

Professional ratings
Review scores
Source	Rating
Allmusic	3/5 stars

Magical Flight is the 1977 album by the pioneer British folk musician Wizz Jones. In addition to composing some of the songs, Alan Tunbridge produced the U.K. cover artwork.

== Track listing ==
1. "Pictures" (Alan Tunbridge) - 4:25
2. "Mississippi John" (Wizz Jones) - 2:01
3. "Old Fashioned Shotgun Wedding" (Tucker Zimmerman) - 4:30
4. "Song to Woody" (Bob Dylan) - 3:32
5. "Topolino Song" (Wizz Jones) - 2:50
6. "Magical Flight" (Alan Tunbridge) - 5:14
7. "The Valley" (Wizz Jones) - 5:14
8. "See How the Time is Flying" (Alan Tunbridge) - 5:19
9. "Canned Music" (Dan Hicks) - 3:37

== Issue details ==
Issued in Germany, 1978, with alternative cover art/remixed.
Exact reissue on CD, 1999, with both English and German covers (but title text on UK cover moved and enlarged, see illustration).

== Catalogue numbers ==
Plant Life PLR009
Folk Freak FF4003(Germany)
Scenescof SCOFCD 1006 (US)

== Personnel ==
- Wizz Jones - guitar, vocals
- Sandy Spencer - cello
- Pete Berryman - guitar
- Rick Kemp - bass
- Nigel Pegrum - drums
- Maddy Prior - background vocals
- Bob Kerr - trumpet
