= Marc Brierley =

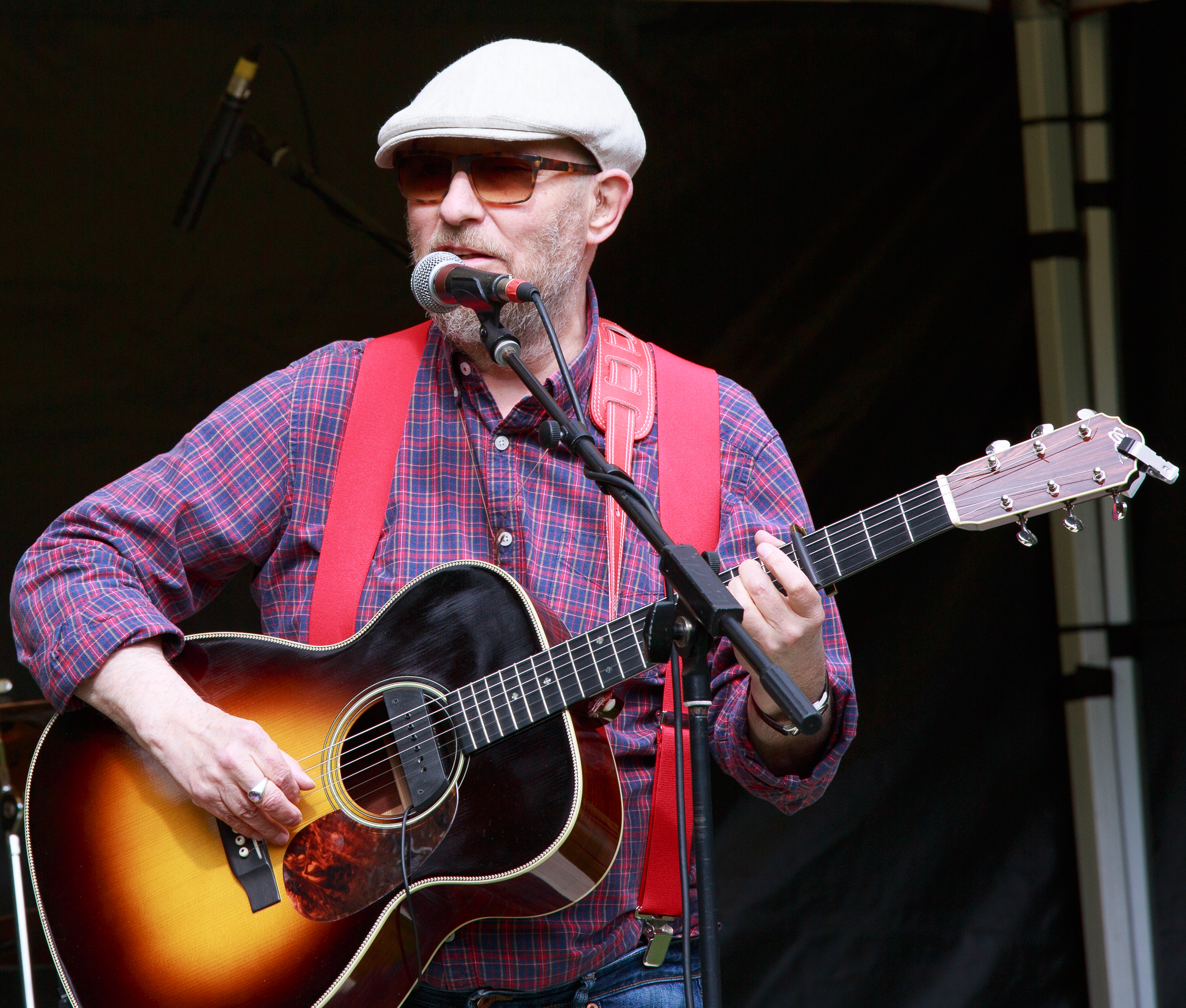
- Brierley performing in July 2017

Background information
- Born: Marcus Brierley; 9 October 1944 (age 82); Derby, England
- Origin: Derby
- Genres: Folk, folk rock, folk baroque, psychedelic folk
- Occupations: Musician, singer-songwriter
- Instruments: Vocals, guitar
- Years active: 1965–present
- Labels: Transatlantic Records; CBS Records; Island Records; Castle Communications; Sanctuary Records; Cherry Tree Records

Marc Brierley (born 9 October 1944) is an English singer songwriter who was active as a performing musician between 1965 and 1973.

== 1965–1970 ==
In 1965, on the encouragement of Bert Jansch, Marc became a regular at Les Cousins folk club in Greek Street London, playing alongside regular performers such as John Renbourn, Sandy Denny, Al Stewart and Trevor Lucas.

Between 1966 and 1970 he wrote, performed and recorded one EP - 1966, Marc Brierley; one LP - 1968, Welcome to the Citadel; a second LP – 1969, Hello produced by Ashley Kozak; two singles taken from the two CBS LPs – "Hold On, Hold On" – 1968, and "Lady of the Light" – 1969; and two further singles, "Stay a Little Longer Merry Ann" CBS, 1969 and "Be my Brother" CBS, 1970.

== 1971–1973 ==
From 1970 to 1973, Marc Brierley continued song writing and performed live throughout the UK with guitarist Steve Cross, culminating in a UK autumn tour as Fairport Convention's support act.

At the end of 1973, Marc Brierley ceased professional musical activity.

== Subsequent years ==
In the intervening period, Brierley's original vinyl recordings have become collectable.

In 2005, Sanctuary Records Group released a double CD set titled Autograph of Time, comprising digitally remastered versions of all Marc Brierley's recorded output of 1966–1970.

In 2014, Cherry Red Records Group released a compilation on the Cherry Tree label with the title, Welcome to the Citadel, using the same cover artwork as the original CBS LP release, comprising the whole of the Citadel recordings with the addition of the Transatlantic Records EP, and a further five previously unreleased tracks derived from rehearsal demos.

Also in 2014, Cherry Red Records Group released a compilation on the Cherry Tree label with the title, Hello, using the same cover artwork as the original CBS LP release, comprising the whole of the Hello recordings with the addition of eight previously unreleased tracks derived from a demo session recorded by Island Records in 1973.

Since the key recordings have been re-issued, Rob Hatch-Miller wrote in his review, "The anthology gives the listener a good idea of Marc Brierley's brilliant musical evolution, from his early days as a straight-faced Dylanite singer-songwriter, to the whimsical and slightly psychedelic folk pop of his later work ... a long overdue introduction to a unique and remarkable artist whose music is more than worthy of a prime spot in the folk-rock canon". Brierley's work has continued to resonate: "His reputation has never stopped growing, however, and a recent CD retrospective has given him a far wider audience than before."

Marc Brierley gave his first full length live performance since 1973 on 24 January 2018 at the Betsey Trotwood, Clerkenwell, London.

== Discography ==
Year of release	Name of Release	Type of Release	Details of Release
1966	Marc Brierley	EP	Released by Transatlantic Records: Cat. No. TRA EP 147
1968	Welcome to the Citadel	LP	Released by CBS Records: Cat. No. 63478
1968	"Hold On, Hold On, The Garden Sure Looks Good Spread On the Floor"	Single	Released by CBS Records: Cat. No. 3857
1969	"Stay A Little Longer Merry Ann”	Single	Released by CBS Records: Cat. No. 4191
1969	Hello	LP	Released by CBS Records: Cat. No. 63835
14 November 1969	"Lady of the Light"	Single	Released by CBS Records: Cat. No. S 4632
6 November 1970	"Be My Brother"	Single	Released by CBS Records: Cat. No. S 5266
1976	Electric Muse	4 LP Anthology	Released by Island Records: Cat no. FOLK 1001; Music from Various Artists; Notes by Karl Dallas
2004	Footprints in the Snow	2 CD Anthology	Castle Communications, Sanctuary Records CMDD834, Cat. No. 050159183425; Music from Various Artists
2005	Marc Brierley - Autograph Of Time: The Complete Recordings 1966-1970	Album	Castle Communications, Sanctuary Records Cat. No. 050749410764 – 2005
2008	Anthems in Eden	4 CD Anthology	Sanctuary Records Cat. No. B0009HL0SA; Music from Various Artists
2014	Welcome to the Citadel	CD Re-issue	Cherry Tree, Cherry Red Records CRTREE013 – cat. no. 013929691322
2014	Hello	CD Re-issue	Cherry Tree, Cherry Red Records CRTEE014 – cat.no. 013929691421
