= Alun Ashworth-Jones =

Studio album by Al Jones
- Released: 1969
- Recorded: 1969
- Genre: Folk, folk rock
- Label: Parlophone, Mooncrest

Professional ratings
Review scores
Source	Rating
AllMusic	4/5 stars

Alun Ashworth-Jones is the full name of the noted British folk/blues/rock songwriter, guitarist and singer Al Jones, and is also the title of his first album, which this article addresses. He had previously made an E.P. as part of the trio Anderson, Jones, Jackson. The album was originally issued by Parlophone in 1969 and has been re-released in CD format by Mooncrest Records in 2001, with additional, previously unreleased tracks.

== Original release ==
Parlophone PMC 7081, 1969 Recorded 5–13 March 1969 at Sound Techniques, London

=== Track listing ===
All compositions by Al Jones except where stated otherwise

1. "Siamese Cat"
2. "Come Join My Orchestra"
3. "Ire and Spottiswoad"
4. "Tramp"
5. "Sarah in the Isle of Wight"
6. "What I Was Thinking" (Take 2)
7. "River Bend (Instrumental)"
8. "Railway Lines"
9. "Big City"

=== Personnel ===
- Al Jones - vocals, guitar
- Mike Piggott - violin
- Harold McNair - flute
- Gordon Huntley - steel guitar
- Percy Jones - electric bass
- Spike Heatley - string bass
- Brian Dobson - drums, percussion

== CD re-release ==
Mooncrest Records CRESTCD 068 Z-UK, 2001

=== Track listing ===
All compositions by Al Jones except where stated otherwise
Tracks as original release, with the following additions:

Previously unreleased version from March 1969 sessions:

1. "What I Was Thinking" (Take 1)

Tracks recorded 24 April 1969 at Sound Techniques, London and previously released on compilation album "49 Greek Street" (RCA SF8118):

1. "It Takes a Lot to Laugh, It Takes a Train to Cry" (Bob Dylan)
2. "Running Shoes" (Willie Dixon song "Down In The Bottom")

Previously unreleased tracks recorded by Bill Leader at Camden in 1971:

1. "Only a Butchers Knife"
2. "Flying"
3. "All My Friends Are Back Again"
4. "Eight Foot Whelk"
5. "Get Out of My Car"

Previously unreleased tracks, recorded 'live' at Les Cousins, 17 March 1969:

1. "Rather Be the Devil" (Skip James song "Devil Got My Woman")
2. "A Mess of Blues" (Mort Shuman, Doc Pomus)
3. "That'll Be the Day" (Buddy Holly, Norman Petty, Jerry Allison)
4. "La Bamba" (trad)
5. "Night Is Falling"
6. "While Travelling on a Train Going West" (trad)
7. "Jupiter" (Gustav Holst)
8. "Sheila" (Tommy Roe)
9. "Boys" (Wes Farrell, Luther Dixon)

=== Additional personnel ===
- Bob Hall - piano
- Martin Stone - guitar
- Gordon Huntley - steel guitar
- Ashley Hutchings - electric bass
- Larry Steele - bass
- Alun Davies - drums
- "Yogue" - guitar

== Production ==
- Engineer, editing and remastering: Dave Garland
- Sleeve notes: John O'Regan (reissue)
