= The Sun Also Rises (duo) =

- Origin: Wales
- Genres: Folk music
- Occupation: Musicians
- Instruments: Guitar, dulcimer, glockenspiel, vibes, percussion
- Years active: c.1970
- Label: The Village Thing

The Sun Also Rises were a Welsh, Cardiff-based folk duo, comprising Graham Hemingway (vocals, guitars) and Anne Hemingway (vocals, dulcimer, glockenspiel, vibes, percussion) who performed in the late 1960s/early 1970s.

== History ==
They were named after the novel by Ernest Hemingway as a comical reference to their shared name. The Hemingways were married in 1968 and impulsively began performing together playing traditional songs and covers in the venues of Cardiff. Anne's only experience of publicly singing before forming the band was in a school choir. Graham's guitar technique brought together classical playing with self-taught flamenco accents.

Their style has been described as "mystical" and "acid-folk", their self-penned compositions being primarily about a fantasy world of mythological beings such as fairies, elves and dragons. They have been compared with the Incredible String Band and Tir-na-Nog.

They toured extensively but recorded only one self-titled album, on The Village Thing label (VTS2) in 1970, produced by Ian A. Anderson, which has become highly sought after as a collector's item. The album featured supporting musicians John Turner (string bass, finger-picked and with a bow), and Andy Leggett (whistle on "Suddenly It's Evening"), both of the Pigsty Hill Light Orchestra.

The album was re-released in 2007 as a CD on the Saydisc label (VTS202).
