= Wizz Jones (album) =

Studio album by Wizz Jones
- Released: May 1969
- Recorded: 1969
- Genre: Folk, folk rock
- Label: United Artists
- Producer: Ed Welch, Pierre Tubbs

Wizz Jones chronology
Wizz Jones (1969)	The Legendary Me (1970)

Professional ratings
Review scores
Source	Rating
Allmusic	4/5 stars

Wizz Jones is the 1969 album by the pioneer British folk musician Wizz Jones. This was Jones' debut solo album, despite having been a performer since 1959.

== Track listing ==
All songs composed by Alan Tunbridge; except where indicated

1. "Teapot Blues" (Wizz Jones)
2. "Shall I Wake You from Your Sleep?"
3. "A Common or Garden Mystery"
4. "I've Got a Woman with One Leg"
5. "Shukkin' Sugar Blues" (Blind Lemon Jefferson)
6. "Earl's Court Breakdown" (based on "Trombone" by Chet Atkins; arranged by Wizz Jones)
7. "Oh My Friend"
8. "Blues and Trouble"
9. "Can't Stop Thinkin' About It" (Alan Tunbridge, Wizz Jones)
10. "Dazzling Stranger"
11. "At the Junction"
12. "American Land" (Pete Seeger)
13. "I Wanna See the Manager"
14. "Corrine's Blues"
15. "Grapes of Life"
16. "Guitar Shuffle" (Lowell Fulson)

== Personnel ==
- Wizz Jones - acoustic guitar, lead vocals

== Label and catalogue information ==
- Label: United Artists
- Cat. no: ULP 1029 (MONO), (S)ULP 1029 (STEREO)

== Production ==
- Liner Notes: Long John Baldry
