= Sixteen Tons of Bluegrass =

Studio album by Pete Stanley and Wizz Jones
- Released: 1966
- Genre: Folk, skiffle, bluegrass
- Label: Columbia, Joker, Rollercoaster
- Producer: Chas McDevitt

Sixteen Tons of Bluegrass is an album by Pete Stanley and Wizz Jones produced by Chas McDevitt, and originally released in the UK in 1966 on Columbia Records. Wizz & Pete were probably the first British musicians to successfully interpret America's favourite traditional music for UK audiences. The album was also released on the Joker label in Italy as Way Out West, with a different cover design. Wizz Jones is quoted, describing the cover, "I've only seen this once, as I recall the alternative sleeve design is hilarious. A mini-skirted girl is perched on a gate being serenaded by a smart young man in blue jeans!"

In 2000 it was released on CD by Rollercoaster Records as More Than Sixteen Tons of Bluegrass and Other Fine Stuff, with the addition of a number of bonus tracks. The bonus tracks comprised the 2 tracks from the duo's 1965 single (Ballad of Hollis Brown, Columbia DB7776) and six previously unreleased tracks from the "Sixteen Tons" recording sessions. The masters of some of the original tracks had been lost by this time, but those tracks were reinstated by dubbing from commercial copies or from acetates, without appreciable deterioration of quality. The CD reissue therefore comprises the entire output of the duo, and includes a gatefold presentation pack with a booklet of detailed notes and archive photographs.

After this album, Stanley continued to play bluegrass with Brian Golbey, and Jones went on to have a mainly solo career, playing blues and contemporary folk songs written by himself and others.

== Track list ==
All tracks are credited as "traditional, arranged by Pete Stanley & Wizz Jones", except where stated otherwise.

1. "Ramblin' and Gamblin" (trad, arr. )
2. "My Grandfather's Clock"
3. "Burglar Man"
4. "Freight Train" (James / Williams / Elizabeth Cotten)
5. "Clinch Mountain Backstep" (trad, arr. Pete Stanley)
6. "Kentucky Moonshiner" (trad, arr. Wizz Jones)
7. "Teardrops In My Eyes" (trad, arr. Pete Stanley)
8. "Ballad of Jed Clampett (theme from The Beverly Hillbillies)" (Paul Henning)
9. "Kentucky Mountain Chimes" (Rusty York)
10. "National Seven" (Alan Tunbridge/Al Jones)
11. "Iowa" (trad, arr. Pete Stanley & Wizz Jones)
12. "Devilish Mary"
13. "Hesitation Blues"
14. "Weepin' Willow Blues" (Edgar Dowell)
15. "Stern Old Bachelor"
16. "Fidlers Green" (Pete Stanley)

== Re-release ==
In 2000, the album was re-released on Rollercoaster Records as "More Than Sixteen Tons of Bluegrass and Other Fine Stuff". The re-released contained the original, fully remastered album as well as eight bonus tracks

1. "Riff Minor"* (Pete Stanley)
2. "Teapot Blues"* (Wizz Jones/Alan Tunbridge)
3. "Riff Minor" (Pete Stanley)
4. "The Ballad of Hollis Brown" (Bob Dylan)
5. "The Cuckoo"* (trad, arr. Pete Stanley & Wizz Jones)
6. "Walk Right In"* (Gus Cannon)
7. "Shuckin' Sugar"* (trad, arr. Pete Stanley & Wizz Jones)
8. "Corinne"* (trad, arr. Pete Stanley & Wizz Jones)

* = Denotes a song that was previously unreleased

== Production ==
- Producer: Chas McDevitt
- Sleeve Notes: Nigel Hunter
- Design and artwork: David Gibsone
- CD production: John Beecher
- Photographs: Chas McDevitt
- Booklet author: Ralph McTell, with additional contributions by Chas McDevitt, John Pilgrim, Pete Stanley, Wizz Jones and Nigel Hunter
