= Les Cousins (music club) =

1960s folk and blues club in Greek Street, Soho, London

Coordinates: 51.5141°N 0.1311°W

Les Cousins was a folk and blues club in the basement of a restaurant in Greek Street, in the Soho district of London, England. It was most prominent during the British folk music revival of the mid-1960s and was known as a venue where musicians of the era met and learnt from each other. As such, it was influential in the careers of, for example, Jackson C. Frank, Al Stewart, Marc Brierley, Davey Graham, Bert Jansch, John Renbourn, Sandy Denny, John Martyn, Alexis Korner, The Strawbs, Roy Harper, The Young Tradition and Paul Simon. Several albums were recorded there.

== Origins ==
Les Cousins was opened on Friday 16 April 1965 in a basement venue at 49 Greek Street, Soho, London (some sources give the address as 48 Greek Street), which had earlier served as a 1950s skiffle club. Upstairs was the Dionysus restaurant owned by a family called Matheou, whose son Andy Matheou ran the basement club. The club was reputed to have taken its name from Claude Chabrol's film Les Cousins (1959), the story of a young man from the country who comes to the city to study law, but is distracted by the rowdy cousin with whom he shares lodgings. However, the name was usually pronounced with English pronunciation, rather than French. The decor included a huge wagon wheel and fishing nets. The club was noted for its all-night sessions and was favoured by the innovative musicians who were less welcome in more purist traditional folk clubs.

Noel Murphy was the first resident musician and compere. Other residents included Alexis Korner and Roy Harper.

== Influence ==
Les Cousins was described by Roy Harper as "a spawning ground" for musical talent. In similar vein, Ian A. Anderson (editor of fRoots) said: "the music got so exciting, 'cause everybody listened to everybody else. So although you might choose to just play one thing, at the same time, you had an open mind for something else."

Notable performers included Alexis Korner, Ralph McTell, The Young Tradition, Sandy Denny, Bert Jansch, Alex Campbell, Wizz Jones, Paul Simon, Joni Mitchell, Marc Brierley, Nick Drake, Al Stewart, Long John Baldry, The Incredible String Band, John Martyn, Cat Stevens, Jackson C. Frank, Martin Carthy, Linda Thompson, Julie Felix, Bridget St John, Donovan, Bob Dylan, The Watersons, Arlo Guthrie, Stephane Grappelli and Diz Disley, Davey Graham, Spider John Koerner, Anne Briggs, Stefan Grossman, Champion Jack Dupree, and Tom Rush, Dave and Toni Arthur, The Sallyangie (a duo consisting of siblings Mike and Sally Oldfield) among others. The blues singer and former Larry Parnes protege rocker, Duffy Power, was also a regular performer.

The club closed in 1972. On 24 November 2004, Les Cousins was reopened for a special Nick Drake tribute, to celebrate his brief but influential career.

As of 2007 a club in Oxford, at the Holywell Music Room, calls itself "Les Cousins".

== Recordings associated with Les Cousins ==
Roy Harper recorded his album Live At Les Cousins there, 30 August 1969 and the Spontaneous Music Ensemble (John Stevens and Evan Parker plus Peter Kowald) also recorded there in 1967.

In 1970 a compilation LP 49 Greek Street was released, featuring artists associated with the club such as Synanthesia, Keith Christmas, Andy Roberts, Robin Scott, Tin Angel, Al Jones, Mike Hart and Nadia Cattouse, although most of the tracks were studio recordings. Ironically, according to Emma Matheou whose father ran the club, the door depicted on the cover is from another address in Greek Street. Long sought after by collectors, the album was reissued on CD in Japan (JASKCD193) in 2007.
