= Young Fashioned Ways =

Live album by Wizz Jones
- Released: 2004
- Recorded: 1 November 2003
- Genre: Folk, folk rock, country blues
- Label: Kulturwerkstatt Buer

Wizz Jones chronology
Lucky the Man (2001)	Young Fashioned Ways (2004)

Young Fashioned Ways is the 2004 live album by the noted British folk guitarist, singer and songwriter Wizz Jones. It was recorded live at the Kulturwerkstatt in Buer, Germany, and released on that venue's own label.

== Track listing ==
1. "Weeping Willow Blues"
2. "Blues Run the Game"
3. "Blues and Trouble"
4. "Funny But I Still Love You"
5. "Magical Flight"
6. "Black dog"
7. "Young Fashioned Ways"
8. "Mother It's Me"
9. "Mississippi John"
10. "Happiness Was Free"
11. "City of the Angels"
12. "Come Back Baby"
13. "Night Ferry"
14. "Bartender Blues"

== Personnel ==
- Wizz Jones – acoustic guitar, lead vocals
- Simeon Jones – harmonica, flute, saxophone, vocals

== Production ==
- Recording and mastering: Werner Brinkmann, WBM Tonstudio
- Photography and cover design: Volker König
- Liner Notes: Wizz Jones
