= Maggie Boyle =

English, London-born folk singer (1956–2014)

Maggie Boyle (24 December 1956 – 6 November 2014) was an English, London-born folk singer, who also played flute, whistle and bodhrán.

== Early life ==
Margaret Boyle was born in the Battersea district of southwest London, and grew up in London's Irish community. Her father was a fiddle player from the Donegal Gaeltacht, and her mother a dancer. In addition to her father, her other main tutor was Oliver Mulligan, a singer from County Monaghan, resident in London. As a youngster Boyle joined the Fulham branch of Comhaltas Ceoltóirí Éireann, through which she won All‑Britain singing competitions. As a teenager Boyle performed with her brothers Kevin and Paul as The Boyle Family. Through the overlapping folk club and Irish music scenes in London she met Steve Tilston, a professional folk singer, and they married in 1984, but divorced by 1999.

== Career ==
In 1984, at the recommendation of Mike Taylor of the musical group Incantation, Boyle joined the live performance production company of Christopher Bruce's ballet Sergeant Early's Dream. Six musicians performed English, Irish and American folk songs at the back of the stage, while a dancer interpreted them at the front. Boyle toured the world with the company for several years. The 1994 CD version of the production featured Incantation plus the Sergeant Early Band, including Maggie Boyle and Steve Tilston.

Boyle was a member of John Renbourn's group Ship of Fools (1988), which released one album on the Run River label, owned and operated by her then husband and fellow group member Steve Tilston.

In 1992, Boyle formed the harmony group Grace Notes with Helen Hockenhull and Lynda Hardcastle. The trio enjoyed success in concerts and festivals throughout the country, and were particular favourites at the annual Whitby folk week. They made five albums, starting with Down Falls the Day (1993) and ending with 20 (2012), to celebrate Grace Notes’s 20th anniversary.

Boyle performed most of the music used in the movie Patriot Games, based on Tom Clancy's novel of the same name. She also sang on the soundtrack of the movie, Legends of the Fall (1994). The following year she contributed background vocals on the Bert Jansch album, When The Circus Comes To Town.

In 2012, Boyle began a website-based travelogue-style project to capture performances and collaborations with various folk songwriters she admired. Entitled Kitchen Songs, it includes performances and duets with Ralph McTell, Jez Lowe, Pete Coe and Steve Tilston – all recorded in their respective kitchens when she visited their homes. Also in 2012, Boyle released a solo album, Won't You Come Away, on Wild Goose Records with Paul Downes on guitar, mandocello and mandolin and Jon Boden on fiddle. She is mother to Joe Tilston, guitarist of the band Random Hand. Much of the Boyle family continue to make music today, including Boyle's brother Kevin, who released his second CD since Bon Cabbage, to which Maggie Boyle contributed, in 2009. Kevin Boyle also continues to tour and record with his band, Le Cheile.

== Death ==
Boyle died from cancer on 6 November 2014 in West Yorkshire, survived by her children and her partner.

== Discography ==
=== Solo albums ===
- Reaching Out (1987)
- Gweebarra (1998)
- Won't You Come Away (2012)

=== Duck Baker, Maggie Boyle and Ben Paley ===
- The Expatriate Game (2005)

=== Grace Notes (including Maggie Boyle) ===
- Down Falls the Day (1993)
- Red Wine and Promises (1998)
- Anchored to the Time (2001)
- Northern Tide (2008)
- 20 (2012)

=== John Renbourn's Ship of Fools (including Maggie Boyle) ===
- Ship of Fools (1988)

=== Sergeant Early Band (with Maggie Boyle) and Incantation ===
- Sergeant Early's Dream/Ghost Dances (1994)

=== Sketch (with Maggie Boyle, Gary Boyle and Dave Bowie) ===
- Sketch (2008)

=== Soundtracks ===
- Patriot Games (1992)
- Legends of the Fall (1994)

=== Steve Tilston & Maggie Boyle ===
- of Moor and Mesa (1992)
- All Under the Sun (1996)

=== Steve Tilston albums featuring Maggie Boyle on some tracks ===
- Silently the Snow Falls (1988)
- Swans at Coole (1990)
- And So It Goes (1996)
- Reaching Back: The Life And Music Of Steve Tilston (5 CD Compilation) (2007)

=== Other albums ===
- Soldiers Three (with Peter Bellamy) (1990)
- When The Circus Comes To Town (with Bert Jansch) (1995)
- A Day's Work (with Mick Ryan) (1996)
- Between Our Hearts (with John McCormick) (1998)
- A Festival Of Folk (Various Artists)
- A Distance From The Town (with Gordon Tyrrall) (1998)
- Michael Is Leaving Las Vegas (with John Drury) (1998)
- Trawlertown: The Singing Of The Fishing (with John Conolly & Pete Sumner) (1998)
- Wake The Vaulted Echoes: A Celebration of Peter Bellamy (with Peter Bellamy) (1999) [3-CD set]
- At Long Last (with Mike Deavin)
- The Surprise (with Pauline Cato & Tom McConville) (1999)
- Bon Cabbage (with The Movies CB) (1999) [CB = Céilí Band]
- The Furrowed Field (with Damien Barber) (2000)
- Black Swan (with Bert Jansch) (2006)
- The Pauper's Path To Hope (with Mick Ryan) (2011) [2-CD set]
