= Soloflight =

Studio album by Wizz Jones
- Released: 1978
- Recorded: 1970–1974
- Genre: Folk, folk rock
- Length: 59:30
- Label: Autogram

Wizz Jones chronology
When I Leave Berlin (1973)	Soloflight (1978)	Lazy Farmer (1975)

Soloflight is the 1978 double album by the pioneer British folk musician Wizz Jones. The album contains covers and traditional folk tunes recorded from 1970 to 1974. The standout tracks are "National Seven", "Pastures of Plenty", "Sally Free and Easy" and "Can't Keep from Crying".

== Track listing ==
1. "National Seven" (Alan Tunbridge) – 3:05
2. "Pastures of Plenty" (Woody Guthrie) – 3:20
3. "Dallas Blues" (George Lewis) – 3:25
4. "Sam Stone" (John Prine) – 4:20
5. "Weeping Willow Blues" (Traditional/B.B. Fuller) – 3:25
6. "Shake, Shake Mama" (Traditional) – 3:10
7. "Second-Hand Mini-Me" (Alan Tunbridge) – 3:20
8. "Sally Free and Easy" (Cyril Tawney) – 4:45
9. "Can't Keep from Crying" (Blind Willie Johnson) – 3:30
10. "Angi" (Davey Graham) – 2:00
11. "Spoonful" (Traditional) – 3:20
12. "National Seven (long version)" (Alan Tunbridge) – 3:50
13. "When You're Gone" (Alan Tunbridge) – 2:40
14. "Come Back Baby" (Lightnin' Hopkins) – 3:30
15. "Cocaine Blues" (Reverend Gary Davis) – 3:10
16. "Frankie" (Mississippi John Hurt) – 2:40
17. "Guitar Shuffle" (Big Bill Broonzy) – 1:55
18. "Winter Song" (Alan Hull) – 4:05

== Personnel ==
- Wizz Jones – acoustic guitar, vocals

== Production ==
- Producer: unknown
- Recording Engineer: unknown
- Mixing: unknown
- Photography: unknown
- Liner Notes: unknown
