= Lazy Farmer =

Studio album by Lazy Farmer/Wizz Jones
- Released: May 1975
- Recorded: January 1975
- Genres: Folk, folk rock
- Label: Songbird
- Producers: Carsten Linde, Wizz Jones

Wizz Jones chronology
| Soloflight (1974) | Lazy Farmer (1975) | Happiness Was Free (1976) |

Professional ratings
Review scores
| Source | Rating |
|---|---|
| Allmusic | 3.5/5 stars |

Lazy Farmer is a 1975 album by British folk rock group Lazy Farmer. This short-lived group consisted of pioneer British folk musician Wizz Jones, his wife Sandy Jones, John Bidwell and Jake Walton. The album was dedicated to American banjo player John Burke, whose book Fiddle Tunes for the Banjo inspired the formation of Lazy Farmer. The album was recorded at Conny Plank's countryside studio in Cologne, Germany.

== Track listing ==
1. "Lazy Farmer" (traditional)
2. "Standing Down in New York Town" (Ralph McTell)
3. "Railroad Boy" (traditional)
4. "Soldier's Joy/Arkansas Traveller" (traditional/Sandford C. Faulkner)
5. "Turtle Dove" (traditional)
6. "John Lover's Gone" (traditional)
7. "Johnson Boys" (traditional)
8. "Love Song" (Derroll Adams)
9. "The Cuckoo" (Clarence Ashley/Hobart Smith)
10. "Sally in the Garden/Liberty" (Traditional)
11. "Gypsy Davey" (traditional/Woody Guthrie)
12. "When I Leave Berlin" (Wizz Jones)

== Personnel ==
- Wizz Jones – acoustic guitar, vocals
- Sandy Jones – banjo, vocals
- John Bidwell – guitar, flue, flageolet, vocals
- Jake Walton – guitar, dulcimer, hurdy-gurdy, vocals
- Don Coging – banjo

== Production ==
- Producer: Carsten Linde/Wizz Jones
- Recording Engineer: Conny Plank
- Cover Design: Jerken Diederich/Annette Welke
- Photography: Fern Mehring
