= Noel Murphy (musician) =

Irish musician and actor (born 1943)

- Born: 27 November 1943 (age 81); Killarney, County Kerry, Ireland
- Genres: Irish music, folk, comedy
- Occupation: Musician
- Years active: 1962–2005
- Labels: Columbia, Fontana, Village Thing, MFP, Plant Life, RCA
- Website: http://www.noelmurphy.org.uk

Noel Murphy (born 27 November 1943) is an Irish folk musician. His family moved to Dublin when he was seven years old. At school he was a keen actor and played drums. He was also a gifted Association Football goalkeeper, being chosen to represent Ireland Schoolboys XI.

In 1962 he moved to England to work in various jobs and began to visit folk clubs in London, where he would often sing "floor spots" as an unpaid support act. In 1964 he began his career as a professional singer and became the first resident singer at the renowned Les Cousins club. Here he compered and performed alongside many celebrated acts including Ralph McTell, Sandy Denny, Bert Jansch and many other notable musicians. He busked his way to Greece and back in 1965, his first recording being released the following year. In 1968 he was joined by young Scottish banjo player Davey Johnstone; they toured as Murf & Shaggis for two years until they added double bass player Ron Chesterman (formerly of Strawbs) to the line-up and changed their name to Draught Porridge. Johnstone moved on to play with Magna Carta and later became guitarist with Elton John's band, a position he still holds. He recorded on the Columbia, Fontana, Village Thing, MFP, Plant Life, and RCA labels, He now runs his own Fine Hairy Rope Records label. In June 1987, Murphy made his only appearance in the UK Singles Chart, with the song, "Murphy and the Bricks". The song became Murphy's only Australian charting single, peaking at 82.

Murphy has appeared on over 300 television programmes and has broadcast on radio over 2,000 times. His television appearances have included two comedies with Eric Sykes for ITV and playing a navvy in The Gathering Seed, on BBC Two. His one-man shows have appeared on Grampian, Trinidad, Southern and Danish television.

His singing career was interrupted for five years from 1982, due to an accident in which he swallowed broken glass, which had found its way into the beer served to him at a charity dinner in a Manx hotel. He retired in 2005 for health reasons.

Outside of his work, he supported rugby and Gaelic games, and played golf; he played for both Surrey and Middlesex during the 1970s, and has partnered Ian Woosnam on BBC Television's Pro-Celebrity Golf as well as taking part in many charity matches.

== Conviction ==
In April 2018, he pled guilty to three incidents of indecent assault against a girl in North Wales during the 1970s and was sentenced to 18 months in prison.

== Selected discography ==
- A Session (1997) – Live recording at Twickenham Folk Club with The Mahogany Gaspipes.
- The Quality of Murphy (2005) – Forty track compilation album covering his work from 1966 to 2002.
