= The Weekend Beatnik =

- Parent company: Southern Rag Ltd
- Founder: Ian A. Anderson
- Genre: Folk, blues, world
- Country of origin: England
- Location: London

The Weekend Beatnik is a British independent record label, which specialises in the reissue of albums within the world, folk, blues and acoustic music genres, often issuing albums in CD format for the first time. The company policy is to provide "maxi-length, mid-price CDs with in-depth notes and archive photos". The firm was founded by Ian A. Anderson, editor of fRoots magazine, as a subsidiary of his company, Southern Rag Ltd, originally formed to publish fRoots magazine under its earlier incarnation as Southern Rag. The label's tagline is "Ahead of Their Time". Most albums were originally issued on the sister Rogue Records label, also created by Anderson.

Artists whose albums have been reissued on the Weekend Beatnik label (as at July 2008) include Maggie Holland, Tiger Moth, The English Country Blues Band, Hot Vultures, Dembo Konte and Kausu Kuyateh, Dave Evans, and Abdul Tee-Jay.
