= Dave Peabody =

- Born: David Peabody; 20 April 1948 (age 78); Southall, Middlesex, London, England
- Genres: Blues, folk
- Occupations: Singer-songwriter, musician, record producer, photographer
- Instruments: Guitar, vocals, harmonica
- Years active: Mid 1960s – present
- Labels: The Village Thing, Matchbox Records, Waterfront Records, Appaloosa Records, various

Dave Peabody (born David Peabody, 20 April 1948, Southall, Middlesex, London, England) is an English singer-songwriter, blues and folk musician, record producer and photographer, active since the late 1960s, who has appeared on more than 60 albums. He is primarily known for his acoustic guitar playing, in both bottleneck and fingerpicking styles.

== Career ==
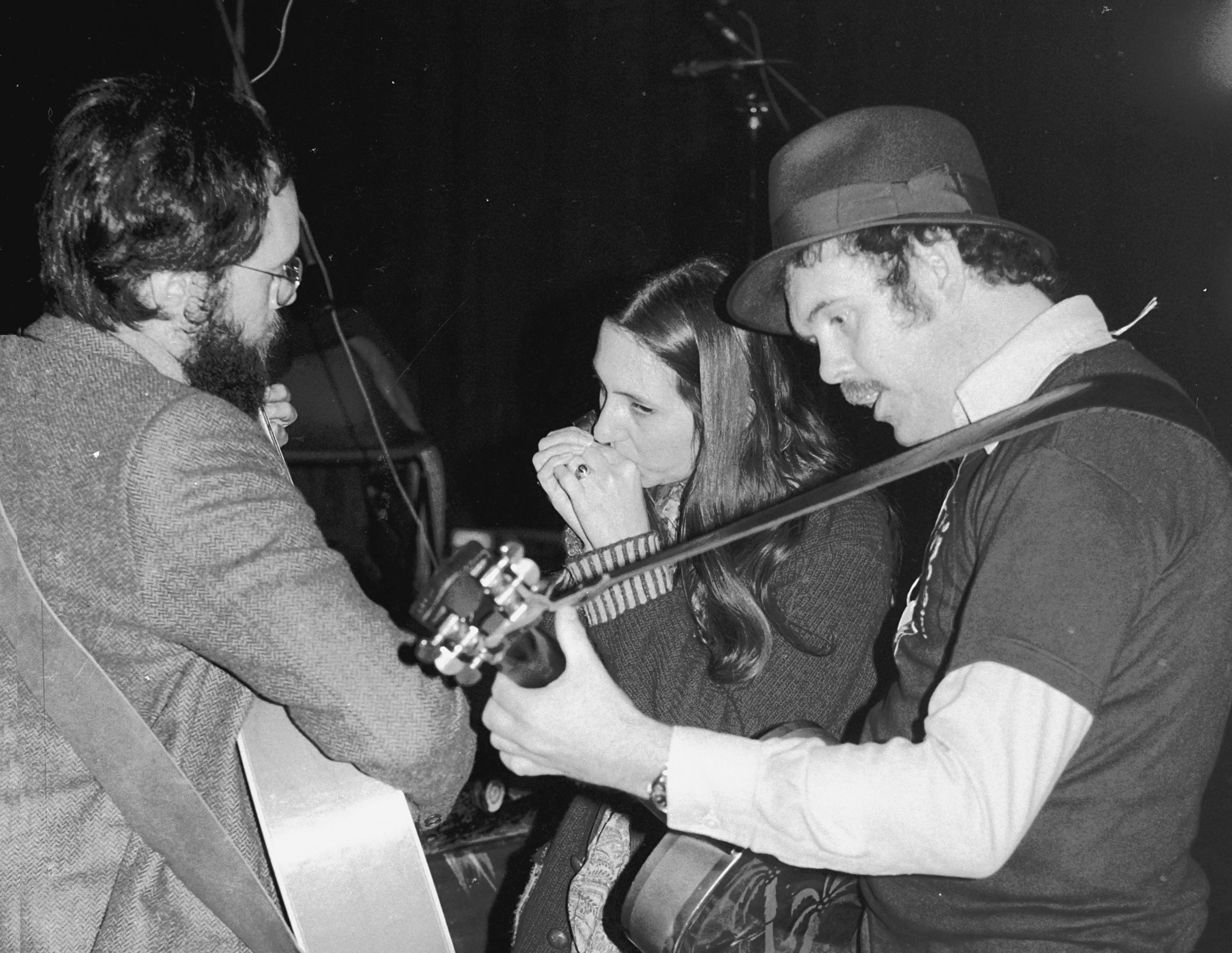
Dave Peabody (at R) jams with Magpie (duo) (U.K. and U.S. folk/acoustic performers), Norwich Festival 1981

Peabody first recorded in 1971 as a member of a group, Polly Flosskin, who recorded an album, Sailin' on the Ocean, and then as a member of a successor group, Tight Like That, on the Village Thing label. He also performed with early versions of Savoy Brown and Fleetwood Mac. His first, self-titled solo album was released in 1973. In all, he has released nine solo albums, the most recent being Side by Slide in 2005. He has also performed and recorded with a wide variety of other blues musicians, notably Charlie Musselwhite and Big Joe Duskin, as well as in a duo with Bob Hall, and has appeared at many blues festivals in the United States and Europe.

In 1996, he replaced Paul King in the King Earl Boogie Band. Peabody was voted "Acoustic Blues Artist of the Year" in 1995, 2001 and 2002.

== Discography ==
=== Solo ===
- Peabody Hotel (1973), The Village Thing
- Keep It Clean (1974), Matchbox Records
- Come and Get It (1976), Matchbox Records
- Blues in Brussels (1977), CL Records
- Payday (1979), Waterfront Records
- Americana (1987), Waterfront Records
- Hands Across the Sea (1993), Appaloosa Records
- Down in Carolina (1997), Appaloosa Records
- Side by Slide (2005), Appaloosa Records

=== With Bob Hall ===
- Down the Road Apiece (1981), Appaloosa Records
- Roll and Slide (1984), Appaloosa Records

=== With Brendan Power ===
- Two Trains Running (2000), Indigo Records

=== With the King Earl Boogie Band ===
- Loaded and Live (2009), Angel Air Records

=== With Colin Earl ===
- Frets & Keys (2009), Valve Records
