= Pigsty Hill Light Orchestra =

- Origin: England
- Genres: Jazz, folk, comedy
- Years active: 1968–1979, 1988–1992
- Labels: The Village Thing

The Pigsty Hill Light Orchestra (or PHLO) were an eccentric band of British musicians, who joined together in early 1968 to play a fusion of comedy, jazz, and folk music, in a unique style which has been compared with The Temperance Seven and the Bonzo Dog Doo-Dah Band. Much of their repertoire consisted of songs from the 1920s or 1930s. Other influences included music hall, blues and jug band music. Their eccentricity arose, not only from their characters and choice of music, but from an eclectic mix of instruments, some of them home-made, such as the 'egg-cupaphone' and the 'ballcockaphone' - a wind instrument in which the supply of air to the reed was controlled by a toilet cistern chain connected to a ballcock.

== History ==
The "Piggies" (as they were affectionally known), derived their unusual name from a location in Bristol; the section of Gloucester Road between the old Bristol North swimming baths and the Horfield Prison turning. They are now considered to be an example of the so-called scrumpy and western musical genre.

Based in the Bristol area, the band originally comprised Barry Back (born 10 April 1944, Bristol, died 2 April 1992), Dave 'The Crutch' Creech (born David Creech, 4 March 1938, Bristol), Andy Leggett (born Andrew Leggett, 31 March 1942, Much Wenlock, Shropshire) and John Turner (born 2 January 1947, Bristol). They are reputed to have got together after meeting at a new year's eve party organised by Fred Wedlock at the Troubadour Club in Clifton, Bristol. They later provided backing for Wedlock on his album, The Folker. Turner was previously in a group called The Downsiders Folk Group, Back and Leggett in The Alligator Jug Thumpers, and Creech in The Elastic Band. They quickly built up a strong local following and were soon playing gigs around the country. Their first album, The Pigsty Hill Light Orchestra Presents (abbreviated as PHLOP!) was the first release on The Village Thing label in 1970. They were joined on this album by Julie Bridson and Ian Hunt.

Turner left the band after this album, and Bill Cole took his place as the fourth member of the band for their second album, Piggery Jokery, also on The Village Thing, in 1971. This album featured an early Rodney Matthews cover, and was recorded in front of an audience in Cornwall, resulting in an authentic recreation of their stage act. Back then left, being replaced by Jon 'Wash' Hays; Leggett left soon afterwards, leaving Creech the only survivor of the original line-up. Various personnel came and went; Dave Paskett (born David Paskett Smith, 3 June 1944, Potters Bar, Hertfordshire), Richie Gould, Pat Small and Henry Davies, plus guitarists Chris Newman (born Christopher Newman, 3 October 1952, Stevenage, Hertfordshire) and Robert Greenfield (born 14 May 1949, Norfolk) came on board plus, occasionally, the guitarist Diz Disley, all of whom appeared on the next album, The Pigsty Hill Light Orchestra, in 1976. The album received good reviews, including this one from the Melody Maker: "The Pigsty Hill Light Orchestra must be one of the most popular acts on the folk scene. Their spontaneous humour and good time songs have held many an audience anchored to the floor in wonder."

Despite continuing popularity, the band split up in May 1979 but, in 1988, reformed for the Trowbridge Village Pump Festival, after which Pat Small and singer Hannah Wedlock (Fred's daughter) joined the line-up and they began touring again. In 1991, they produced another album, Back on the Road Again and, in the same year, Jim Reynolds and Dave Griffiths joined the band. The following year, Musical History, a compilation album consisting of a selection of tracks taken from 1968 to 1992, was released. Back, who had been the driving force behind the "Piggies" reunion, died on 10 April 1992 and, shortly after, the band decided to pack up for good.

Founder member Dave Creech died of cancer on 4 May 2011. Little more than a month earlier he was still performing regularly with various local bands.

== Discography ==
- The Pigsty Hill Light Orchestra Presents (PHLOP!) (12" vinyl album) The Village Thing VTS 1 (1970)
  1. "Cushion Foot Stomp"
  2. "Funny Side of the Street"
  3. "Silk Pyjamas"
  4. "Company Policy"
  5. "On Sunday"
  6. "Second Fiddle"
  7. "T'aint No Sin"
  8. "Sleepy Time Blues"
  9. "My Pet"
  10. "Nothing Else Will Do Babe"
  11. "Sporting Life Blues"
  12. "Men of Harlech"
- Piggery Jokery (12" vinyl album) The Village Thing VTS 8 (1971)
  1. "Sadie Green"
  2. "Motorway Song"
  3. "High Society"
  4. "The Wiltshire Plumbers Saga"
  5. "Sweet Miss Emmaline"
  6. "Let Your Linen Hang Low"
  7. "Basin Street Blues"
  8. "Meet Me Where They Play the Blues"
  9. "Desperate Dan"
  10. "The Silly Organ Story"
  11. "Shim Sham Shimmy"
  12. "Royal Garden Blues"
- Us (12" vinyl album, various artists) The Village Thing VT-SAM 15 (1972)
  1. "Sweet Miss Emmaline" (from Piggery Jokery)
- Also included tracks by Dave Evans, Tight Like That, Wizz Jones, Fred Wedlock, Steve Tilston, Ian A. Anderson, Tucker Zimmerman, Sun Also Rises and Hunt and Turner
- The Pigsty Hill Light Orchestra (12" vinyl album) UK private pressing PHLO-001 (1976)
  1. "High Society"
  2. "Buddy Not A Sweetheart"
  3. "Coney Island"
  4. "Jazzbo Green"
  5. "Everybody's Making It Big"
  6. "Motorway"
  7. "You're Always Welcome"
  8. "Five Foot Two"
  9. "Short Of The Line"
  10. "D.I.V.O.R.C.E."
  11. "Taking My Oyster For Walkies"
  12. "Roland The Roadie"
- Back on the Road Again (12" vinyl album) (1991)
- Musical History (12" vinyl album) (1992)
