= Fred Wedlock =

English folk singer (1942–2010)

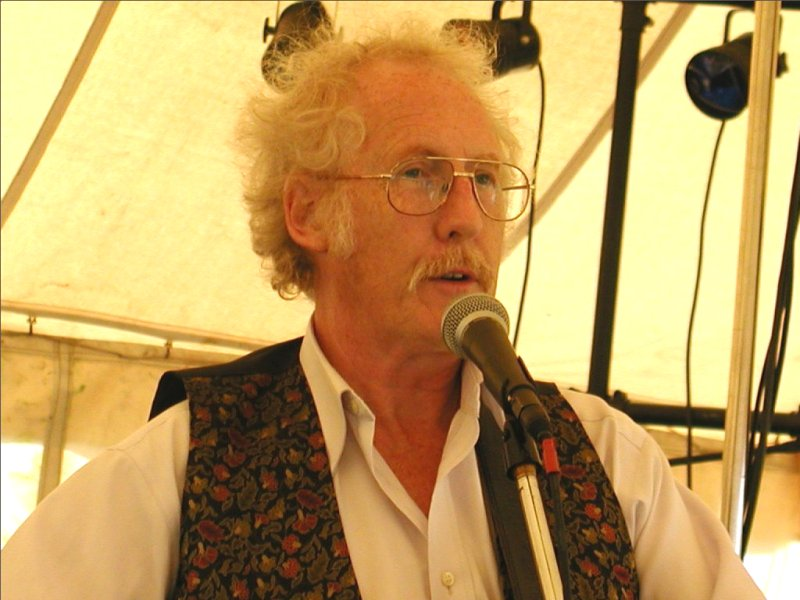
- Wedlock performing at Allerford Folk Festival in 2003

Background information
- Born: Peter Frederick Wedlock; 23 May 1942; Bristol, England
- Died: 4 March 2010 (aged 67) Bath, England
- Genres: Comedy, folk, Scrumpy and Western
- Occupations: Humorist, guitarist, singer, songwriter, actor
- Years active: 1960s–2010
- Labels: Various, see Discography
- Formerly of: Pigsty Hill Light Orchestra

Peter Frederick Wedlock (23 May 1942 – 4 March 2010) was an English folk singer best known for his UK hit single "The Oldest Swinger in Town", which was covered by German comedian Karl Dall as "Der älteste Popper der Stadt". He performed at many venues in Britain and Europe, presented programmes for West Country TV and acted with the Bristol Old Vic, as well as undertaking after-dinner speaking engagements.

== Early life ==
Fred Wedlock was born in the old Bristol Maternity Hospital in Southwell Street, Kingsdown, Bristol. He was brought up in Redcliffe, where his father ran the York House pub. He sang in the church choir at St Mary Redcliffe. Wedlock was educated at Bristol Grammar School in the 1950s. He represented the school and the Old Bristolians playing hockey.

== Career ==
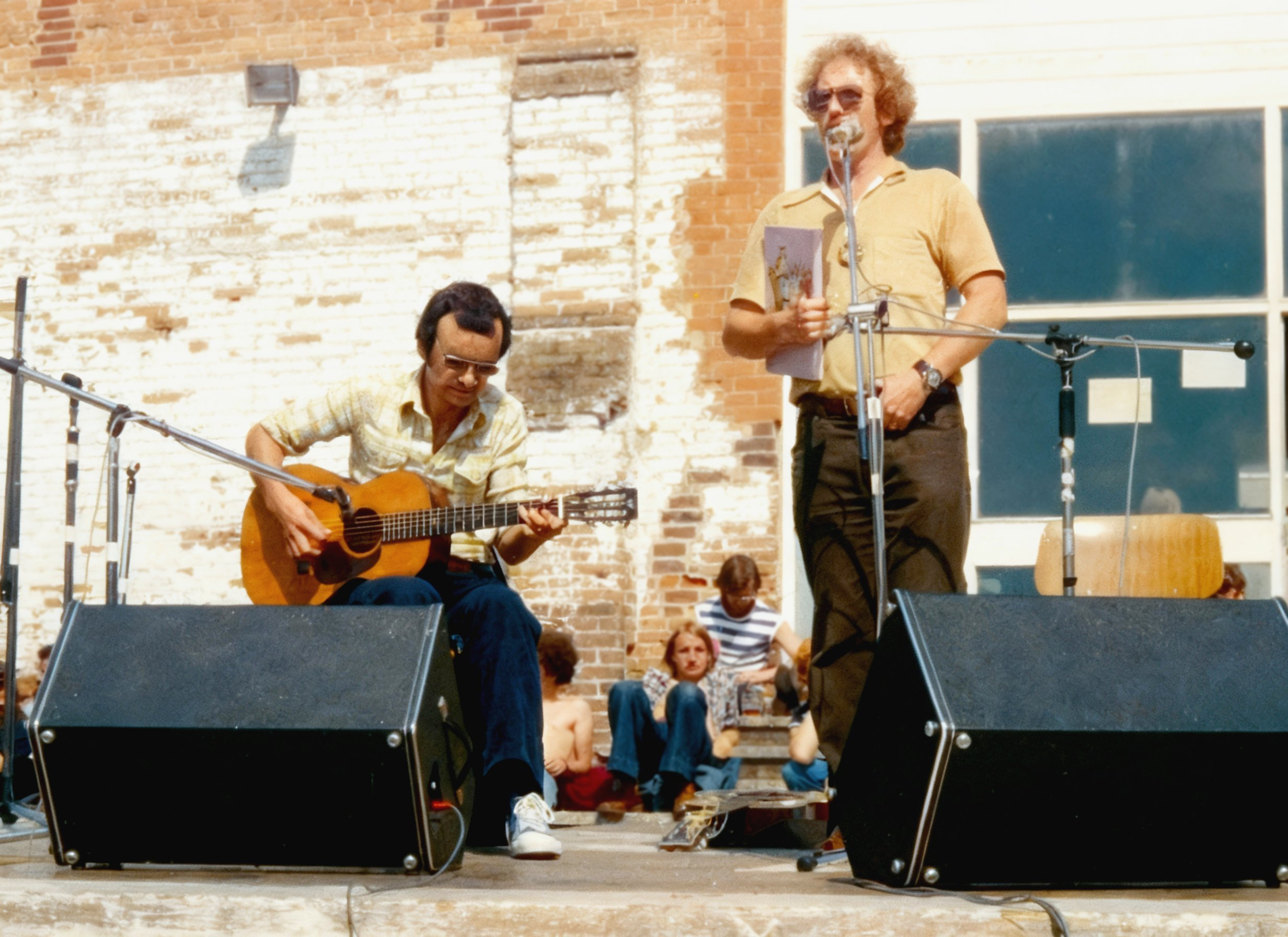
Wedlock in 1978, accompanied by Chris Newman on guitar

After attending Swansea University, he taught in the East End of London during the 1960s, at South Bristol College, Elm Park School Winterbourne and the Castle School, Thornbury (1969 to 1971), before taking up music full-time in the 1970s. Wedlock was a regular performer at the Bristol Troubadour Club and he played the folk circuit, both prior to, and in the wake of, his single chart success, with performances at clubs and festivals all over the world. He also presented many programmes on West Country TV including Bargain Hunters on HTV. In 1997 Wedlock took a leading role in Bristol Old Vic's production of Up the Feeder, Down the Mouth, a theatrical history of Bristol Docks, written by A. C. H. Smith. In 2001 the production was restaged on the waterfront. He also appeared in several productions for Bristol theatre company, The Ministry of Entertainment, most recently in December 2009.

Wedlock's albums include The Folker (1971) (notable for the title track parody of "The Boxer" by Simon and Garfunkel), Frollicks (1973), Out of Wedlock (1978), The Oldest Swinger in Town (1981) and Fred Wedlock Live (1982). In early 1981 "The Oldest Swinger in Town", reached number 6 in the UK Singles Chart. The song was subsequently released in Australia where it peaked at number 60.

His daughter, Hannah Wedlock, was an occasional member of the Pigsty Hill Light Orchestra, another Bristol-based outfit, whom Fred made his support band at an early stage of their career. She now performs with the Blue Note Jazz Band. His grandfather, Billy Wedlock, captained Bristol City F.C. and was a regular for England in the early 20th century. The former Wedlock Stand at Ashton Gate was named in his honour. He lived at Amesbury near Timsbury, Somerset where for many years he contributed to village life by providing entertainment and helping with raising funds for local projects.

== Death ==
It was announced on 4 March 2010 that Fred Wedlock had died, in hospital in Bath, Somerset, following a heart attack, after having contracted pneumonia. Dick Greener of Strawbs Web, the website of folk rock band The Strawbs, said that he was "A huge comic talent, and an all round thoroughly nice guy, I know ... those who have seen Fred in the past during his long and successful career, would want to pass on their condolences to Fred's family." Derek Cleverdon, chairman of the Variety Club Children's Charity South West, said Wedlock was also devoted to charitable causes. "He performed on numerous occasions for the Variety Club, and raised thousands of pounds for us over the years."

A large number of people attended a funeral service held at St Mary Redcliffe church on 15 March 2010. Family and friends paid homage with tributes and songs. A local press report said that "he filled Bristol's largest church to capacity."

Wedlock was survived by his wife and two daughters.

== Personal papers and recordings ==
Videos and CDs of television programmes and performances, promotional photographs and press cuttings, song lyrics, jokes, scripts, research notes, papers and correspondence are held by Bristol Archives (Ref. 44790) (online catalogue).

== Summary discography ==
- The Folker – Village Thing VTS 7, 1971
- Frollicks – Village Thing VTS 20, 1973
- Home Made – Pillock Produckshuns PPS1, 1975
- Greatest Hits (not a compilation as the title suggests: new live recordings of songs predominantly from his first two albums) – Pillock Produckshuns PPS17, 1977
- Out of Wedlock – One Up OU2217, 1978
- The Oldest Swinger in Town (with Chris Newman) – Pillock Produckshuns PPS 271, 1979
- The Oldest Swinger in Town (different track listing) – Rocket TRAIN 13, 1981
- Live (with Chris Newman) – Rocket TRAIN 19, 1982
- The Complete 'Folker' and 'Frollicks' Albums – Village Thing, 2008
- Wrinklies' Revolution – own label
- Souvenir – own label
- Something Old, Something New – own label
- Festive Fred – own label

== See also ==
- Scrumpy and Western
- Scrumpy & Western EP
