= Steve Tilston =

- Tilston in 2008

Background information
- Born: 26 March 1950 (age 76); England
- Genres: Folk
- Occupation: Singer-songwriter
- Instruments: Vocals; guitar; arpeggione
- Years active: 1971–present
- Labels: Hubris, Run River Records
- Website: www.stevetilston.com

Steve Tilston (born 26 March 1950) is an English folk singer-songwriter and guitarist.

== Background ==
Steve Tilston was born in Liverpool and brought up in Leicestershire. A graphic designer before taking up music in 1971, Tilston lived in Bristol where he recorded his first album, An Acoustic Confusion. In the early 1980s, he ran a folk club with Bert Jansch in New Kings Road, London. Tilston recorded a rock album in 1982 called In for a Penny – In for a Pound, but soon reverted to quieter music. In 1985, Tilston played guitar and mandolin with the on-stage band for "Sergeant Early's Dream" while on tour with Ballet Rambert, and again when the ballet toured England in 2000–2001. Tilston formed his own record label, Run River, in 1987, and in 1988 he was a member of John Renbourn's group Ship of Fools, which released one eponymous album on Tilston's label. In 1990, he was a session musician on Peter Bellamy's album Soldiers Three. By the 1990s, Tilston was frequently performing with Maggie Boyle, whom he had married in 1984. Tilston garnered positive reviews in the United States for his 1992 album, Of Moor and Mesa, which contained two of his compositions, "The Slip Jigs and Reels" and "The Naked Highwayman", that were later recorded by Fairport Convention. Tilston formed Hubris Records in 1995.

== Career ==
=== As solo artist ===
He then joined WAZ! with Pete Zorn and Maartin Allcock. In 2003, there was a slight change of direction as he moved towards melodic jazz with Such And Such, an album with saxophonist Andy Sheppard. Live Hemistry was not a misspelling for "Chemistry" but a live album with many of his best songs, so named because the live recordings are taken from the UK and Australia, thus from two hemispheres. The Thomas Paine Society selected his song "Here's to Tom Paine" as their theme song. His song "Night Owl" was not only recorded by Dolores Keane, but was the title of her 1998 album. His songs have been recorded by Fairport Convention, Dolores Keane, The House Band, Peter Bellamy, North Cregg, Bob Fox, John Wright and others. His instrumental style crosses classical music with Irish and English folk. He also plays an early 19th-century instrument called an arpeggione (bowed guitar). He has been a tutor at summer camps. In 2007, Reaching Back was released. This was a boxed set of five CDs of his songs, with rarities and contributions from Wizz Jones, Ralph McTell and Coope, Boyes and Simpson. 2008 saw the release of another solo album, Ziggurat. He performed a 40th anniversary concert in Bristol on 23 September 2010 with guests Wizz Jones, Keith Warmington, Brooks Williams, Chris Parkinson, Maggie Boyle, Hugh Bradley, and his children Martha, Joe and Molly

Steve announced the release of a new album in Spring 2025 during a show at Stratford Upon Avon, adding that it'll be called 'Final Call', and that'll it'll most likely be his last album. This will be preceded by a new single called 'As Night Follows Day', released on 22 November 2024.

In 2026 Tilston embarked on a final tour of the UK "Steve Tilston and Friends", touring with Hugh Bradley on double bass, Keith Warmington on harmonica and jazz drummer Tony Orrell on percussion..

=== Steve Tilston & The Durbervilles ===
In 2010, Tilston also began working with Yorkshire-based band The Durbervilles, with a selection of low key live dates followed by work in the studio. The first fruits of the collaboration was a track on a Bob Dylan 70th birthday tribute album put out by UK label, Fat Cat Records. Steve Tilston & The Durbervilles then worked as a touring unit appearing at various venues in the UK including Cropredy Festival 2011. In March 2012, Steve Tilston & the Durbervilles released The Oxenhope EP.

=== TV work and Folk Award ===
In 2011, Tilston released his solo album, The Reckoning, on his own Hubris label. In October 2011, he performed "Oil & Water" from the album on Later... with Jools Holland. He was subsequently interviewed by Jools Holland "at the piano" and the pair paid homage to the late Bert Jansch who died earlier in the month. In February 2012 the title track from The Reckoning was awarded Best Original Song at the BBC Radio 2 Folk Awards. The award was shared with Bella Hardy, who polled exactly the same number of votes.

=== Letter from John Lennon ===
In August 2010, it was reported that John Lennon had penned a letter of support to Tilston in 1971, though it was never delivered. Lennon had been inspired to write to the then 21-year-old folk singer after having read an interview in ZigZag magazine in which Tilston admitted he feared wealth and fame might negatively affect his songwriting. Tilston did not become aware of the letter's existence until a collector contacted him in 2005 to verify its authenticity. "Being rich doesn't change your experience in the way you think", Lennon wrote. It was signed "Love John and Yoko." This letter was the inspiration behind the 2015 film Danny Collins.

== Personal life ==
=== Family ===
Tilston has four children, Sophie Tilston born January 1975, Martha Tilston born June 1976 to first wife Naomi Lyons. Joe Tilston born June 1984 and Molly Tilston born March 1989 to second wife Maggie Boyle.

Tilston married Margaret Robson in 2004

His daughter Martha also maintains a folk music career as a solo artist while his son Joe Tilston is in the ska-punk band, Random Hand. Sophie Tilston is a successful designer and Molly Tilston performs music while training to be a nurse.

== Discography ==
=== Solo albums ===
- An Acoustic Confusion (1971) (1997 reissue)
- Collection (1972)
- Songs From the Dress Rehearsal (1977) (2005 reissue)
- In for a Penny, In for a Pound (1982)
- Life by Misadventure (1987)
- Swans at Coole (1990)
- And So It Goes (1995)
- The Greening Wind (1999 compilation of 1971–1992 recordings)
- Solorubato (1999)
- Live Hemistry (2001)
- Such and Such (2003)
- Of Many Hands (2005)
- Reaching Back: The Life And Music of Steve Tilston (5 CD Compilation) (2007)
- Ziggurat (2008)
- The Reckoning (2011)
- Truth To Tell (2015)
- Distant Days (2018)
- Such Times (2021)
- Last Call (2025)

=== As contributor to compilations ===
- The Music of O'Carolan (1987)
- Silently the Snow Falls (1989)

=== With John Renbourn's Ship of Fools ===
- John Renbourn's Ship of Fools (1988)

=== With Maggie Boyle ===
- Of Moor and Mesa (1992)
- All Under the Sun (1996)

=== As member of WAZ! ===
- Fully Chromatic (1999)

=== With The Durbervilles ===
- The Oxenhope EP (2012)

=== With the Steve Tilston Trio ===
- Happenstance (2013) (with Stuart Gordon (violin, vocals, viola, mandolin, ukulele [soprano, baritone, bass], harmonium, piano, percussion) and Keith Warmington (harmonica, vocals)

=== With Jez Lowe ===
- The Janus Game (2016)

=== DVDs ===
- Sound Techniques – Guitar Maestros #5 (2006)

=== Books ===
- The Steve Tilston Music Book – A collection of songs and tunes in notation and tablature.
- All For Poor Jack (Isthmus Books – 2010) – Steve's first novel.
