= Wizz Jones =

British musician (1939–2025)

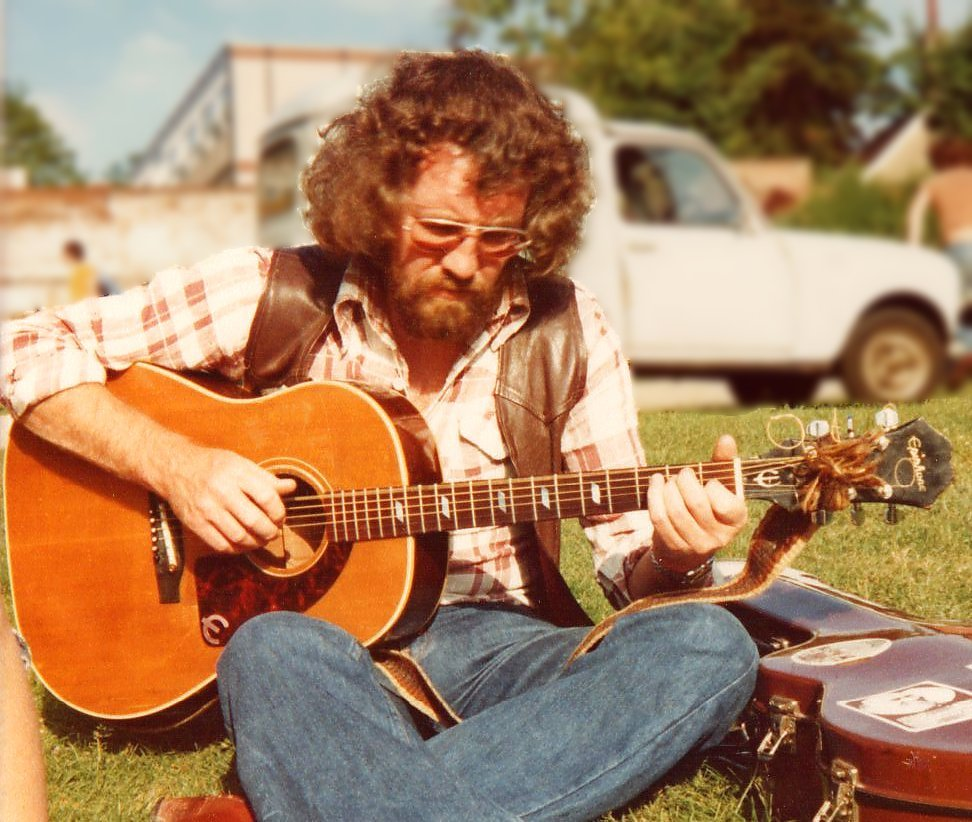
- Jones in 1978

Background information
- Born: 25 April 1939; Thornton Heath, Surrey, England
- Died: 27 April 2025 (aged 86)
- Genres: Folk
- Occupations: Musician, singer-songwriter
- Instruments: Vocals, guitar
- Years active: Late 1950s–20??
- Labels: United Artists; Village Records; CBS Records; Hux Records; Fellside Records; Run River Records
- Website: www.wizzjones.com

Raymond Ronald "Wizz" Jones (25 April 1939 – 27 April 2025) was an English acoustic guitarist, and singer-songwriter. He performed from the late 1950s and recorded from 1965 until 2025. He possessed what was described as "unparalleled virtuosity" on the guitar and worked with many of the notable guitarists of the British folk revival, such as John Renbourn and Bert Jansch. He taught Keith Richards, Eric Clapton was "an avid follower", and others he influenced included Rod Stewart, Paul Simon and Bruce Springsteen.

== Career ==
=== Early days ===
Jones was born on 25 April 1939 in Thornton Heath, Surrey. His father, who had been listed as "missing in action" in World War II, reappeared three years later, and Jones wrote "one of his most poignant songs", 'The Burma Star', about his father's experiences during the war and his struggle to readjust afterwards. He became infatuated with the bohemian image of Woody Guthrie and Jack Kerouac and grew his hair long. His mother started calling him Wizzy after the Beano comic strip character "Wizzy the Wuz" because at the age of nine he performed card tricks, and the nickname stuck throughout his school years. When he formed his first band, a skiffle group called "The Wranglers", in 1957, the name became permanent. He took up the guitar in the mid-1950s after being inspired by seeing American folk and blues musicians Big Bill Broonzy and Ramblin' Jack Elliott perform in London.

In the early 1960s Jones went busking in Paris, and mixed in an artistic circle that included Rod Stewart, Alex Campbell, Clive Palmer (The Incredible String Band) and Ralph McTell. After a couple of years travelling throughout Europe and North Africa he returned to England, and married his long-time girlfriend Sandy to raise a family. He appeared on BBC television with Alan Whicker in a feature about beatniks. Bert Jansch said later that he thought Jones was "the most underrated guitarist ever."

In the mid-1960s he had a recording contract with United Artists, and among several solo releases was Bob Dylan's "Ballad of Hollis Brown". By this time the skiffle boom was over but one of the stars of that movement, Chas McDevitt, used Jones' guitar-playing on five albums in 1965 and 1966. Another musician on those sessions was the bluegrass banjo-player, Pete Stanley. In 1966, Jones and Stanley released an album, Sixteen Tons of Bluegrass. The partnership ended in 1967 when Jones turned solo.

=== The folk period ===
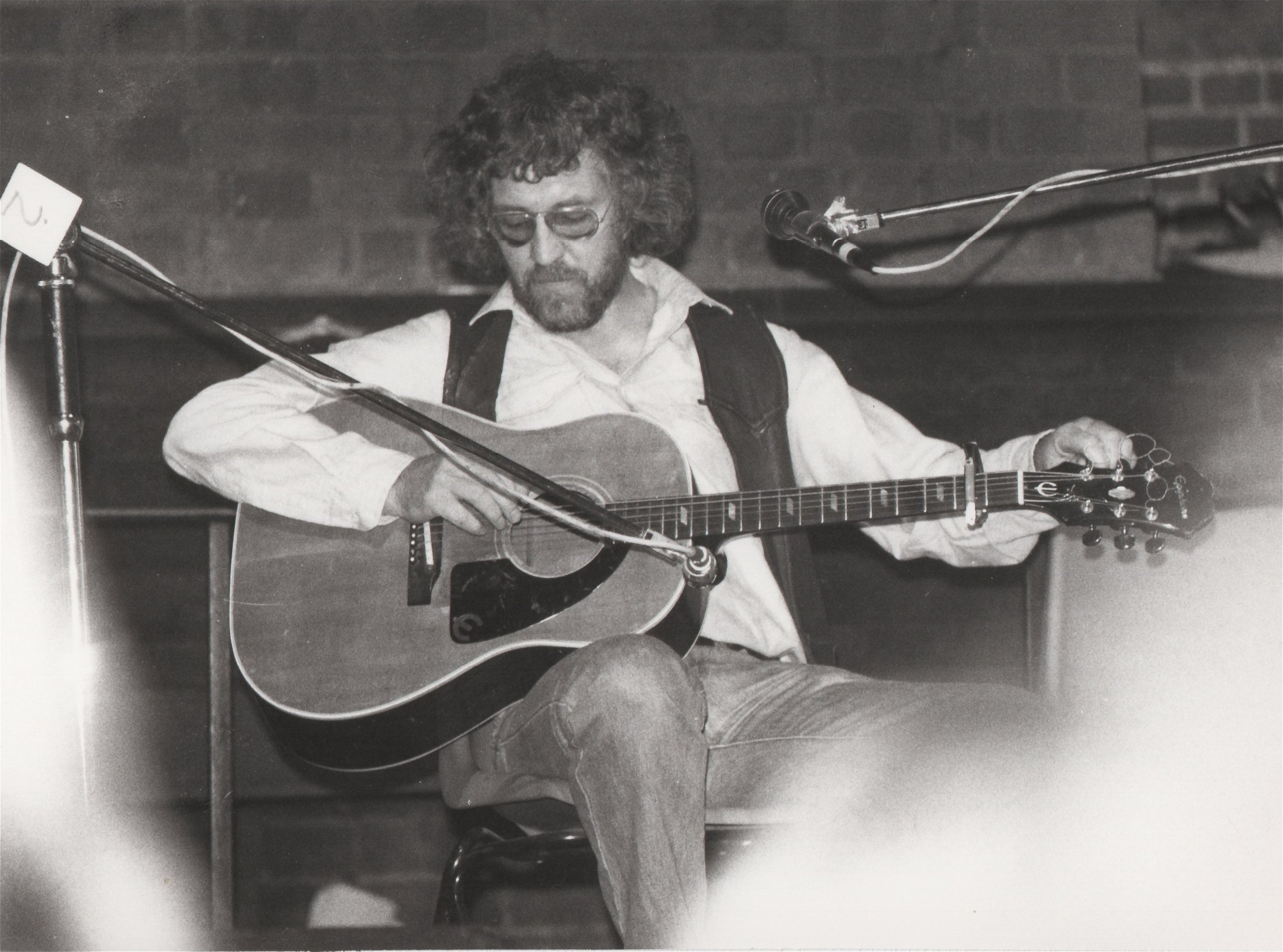
Jones performing at the 1981 Norwich Folk Festival, UK

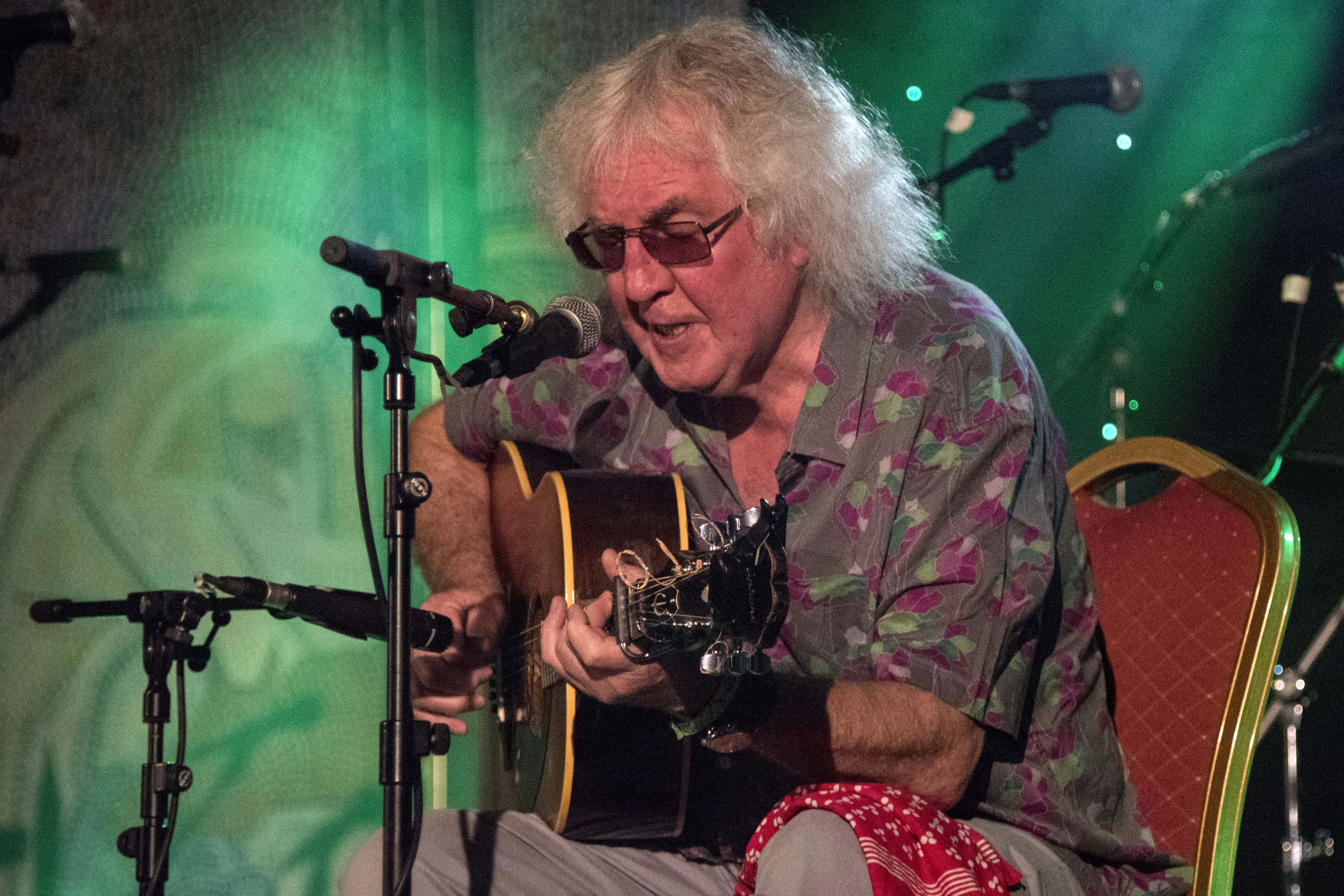
Jones performing in Portugal, 2015

Jones became a singer-songwriter and his first solo album, Wizz Jones, was released in 1969. Eight of the songs on it were written by his long-time friend Alan Tunbridge. Jones was once described as having "a right hand worthy of Broonzy", referring to the blues guitarist Big Bill Broonzy. He played on Ralph McTell's album Easy in 1974. Ten solo albums followed up to 1988. Most of his recordings from this period have been long out of print. Jones guided singer-songwriter-guitarist Steve Tilston through the early stages of his career.

Jones briefly joined acoustic folk-rock group Accolade (its other band members were Don Partridge, Brian Cresswell and Malcolm Poole) in 1971 as backing guitarist, and he is featured on the group's second album, Accolade II. Another brief excursion, in 1975 as a member of the traditional folk band Lazy Farmer, produced an album that was reissued in 2006. Jones was very popular in Germany from the mid–1970s, and later in life he still toured mainland Europe every year. The early 1990s were a quiet period, when he almost disappeared from public view.

In the mid-1990s he appeared in the Bert Jansch television documentary Acoustic Routes and there was renewed interest in his work. He undertook his first tour of the US in the late 1990s. In 2001, he led John Renbourn and other members of Pentangle on the album Lucky The Man. In late 2001 he was to have supported Sonic Youth in major shows in New York and Boston, and was en route across the Atlantic on 9/11 when the flight had to turn back. In 2007, The Legendary Me and When I Leave Berlin were reissued on CD by the Sunbeam record label.

On 30 May 2012, Bruce Springsteen opened the sold-out Wrecking Ball concert at Olympic Stadium in Berlin, Germany, with Jones's 1971 song, "When I Leave Berlin". In 2015, Jones toured with John Renbourn, playing a mixture of solo and duo material, before Renbourn's death in March of that year. An album by the pair, titled Joint Control, was released in 2016.

== Death ==
Jones died on 27 April 2025, at the age of 86.

== Discography ==
=== Solo albums ===
- Wizz Jones (1969)
- The Legendary Me (1970)
- Right Now (*) (1972)
- Winter Song (E.P.) (1973)
- When I Leave Berlin (**) (1973)
- Soloflight (***) (1974)
- Lazy Farmer (1975)
- Happiness Was Free (1976)
- Magical Flight (1977)
- Letter from West Germany (197?)
- The Grapes of Life (1987)
- Live In Dublin (cassette tape only, 1991)
- Late Nights and Long Days (****) (1993)
- Dazzling Stranger (1995)
- Through the Fingers (2001)
- Lucky The Man (2001)
- More Late Nights and Long Days (****) (2003)
- Young Fashioned Ways (****) (2004)
- Huldenberg Blues (Live in Belgium) (2006)
- When I Leave Berlin: Expanded Edition (**) (2007)
- Lucky the Man (Extra tracks) (2007)

(*) with John Renbourn, Sue Draheim, and others. (**) with Bert Jansch. (***) includes recordings from 1970 to 1974. (****) with Simeon Jones.

=== Collaborations and compilations ===
==== Pete Stanley and Wizz Jones ====
- Sixteen Tons of Bluegrass (1966) (issued in Italy as Way Out West)
- More Than Sixteen Tons of Bluegrass and Other Fine Stuff (2000) (re-issue of above on CD with additional, previously unissued, tracks)

==== John Renbourn and Wizz Jones ====
- Joint Control (World Music Network, 2017)

==== Lazy Farmer (including Wizz Jones) ====
- Lazy Farmer (1975)

==== Wizz Jones and Werner Lämmerhirt ====
- Roll on River (1981)

==== Anthology – Alex Campbell, Andy Irvine, Wizz Jones, Finbar Furey, Dolores Keane et al. ====
- Folk Friends (1979)
- Folk Friends 2 (1981)

==== Wizz Jones & Ralph McTell ====
- About Time (2016)
- About Time Too (2017)

==== Wizz Jones, Pete Berryman & Simeon Jones ====
- Come What May (2017)

==== Compilations ====
- The Village Thing Tapes (1992)

=== Singles ===
- "The Ballad of Hollis Brown" / "Riff Minor" (1965)

=== Videos and DVDs ===
- Masters of the British Guitar (VHS) (1998)
- Wizz Jones – Maestros of the Guitar No 1 (2006)

=== Session recordings ===
- Ralph McTell: Easy (1974)
- Derroll Adams: Songs of the Banjoman (1984)
- Clive Palmer: Clive Palmer's Banjoland (recorded 1967, released 2007)
