= John Renbourn =

English guitarist and songwriter (1944–2015)

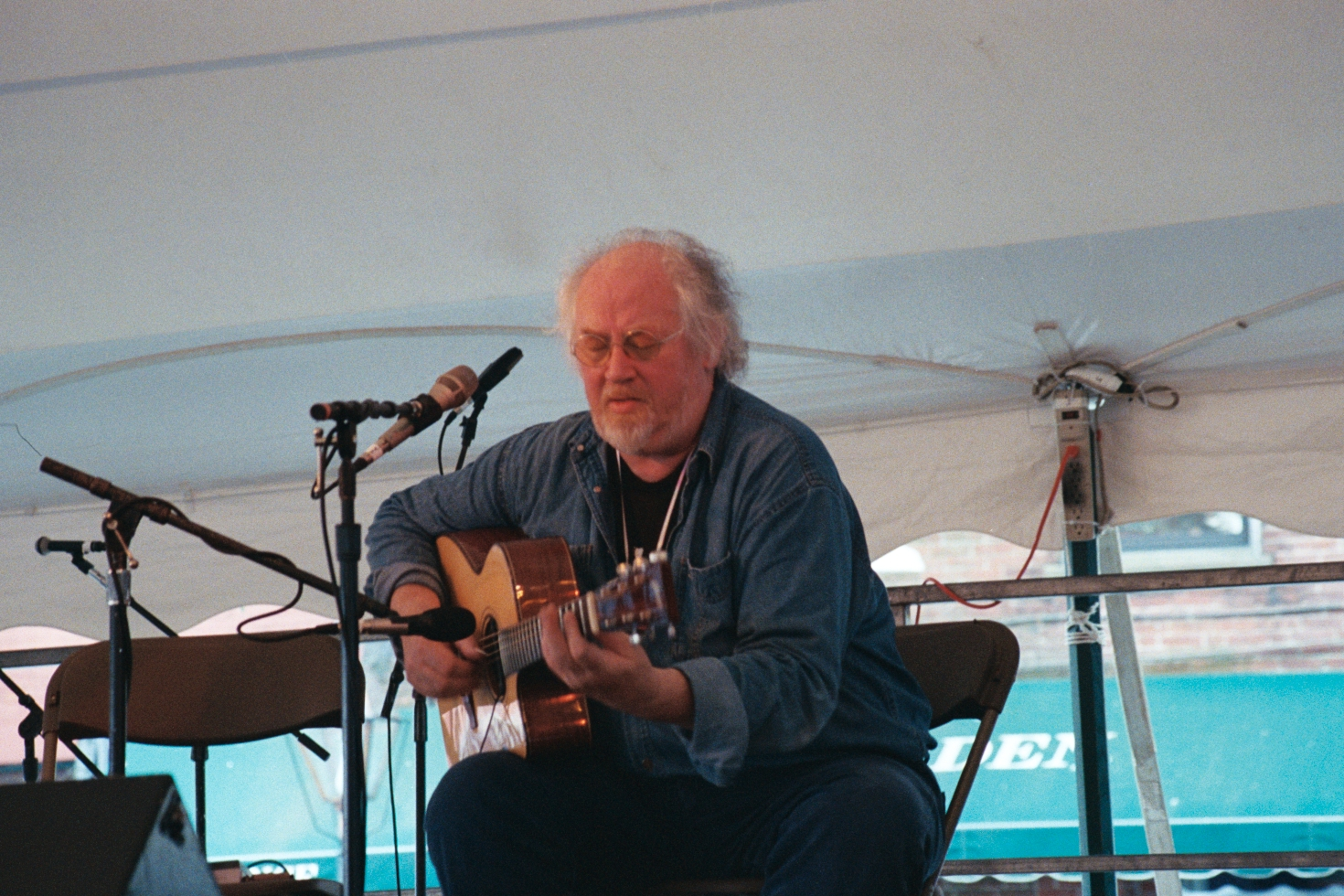
- John Renbourn on the Custom House Square stage at New Bedford Summerfest 2005

Background information
- Born: 8 August 1944; Marylebone, London, England
- Died: 26 March 2015 (aged 70) Hawick, Scotland
- Genres: Folk, folk baroque, folk rock
- Occupations: Musician, songwriter
- Instruments: Acoustic guitar, sitar, cittern, recorder, piano, Shakuhachi
- Years active: 1961–2015

John Renbourn (8 August 1944 – 26 March 2015) was an English guitarist and songwriter. He was best known for his collaboration with guitarist Bert Jansch as well as his work with the folk group Pentangle, although he maintained a solo career before, during and after that band's existence (1967–1973). Several albums were credited to the John Renbourn Group. He worked later in a duo with Stefan Grossman.

While most commonly labelled a folk musician, Renbourn's musical tastes and interests took in early music, classical music, jazz, blues and world music. His most influential album, Sir John Alot (1968), featured his take on tunes from the medieval period.

== Biography ==
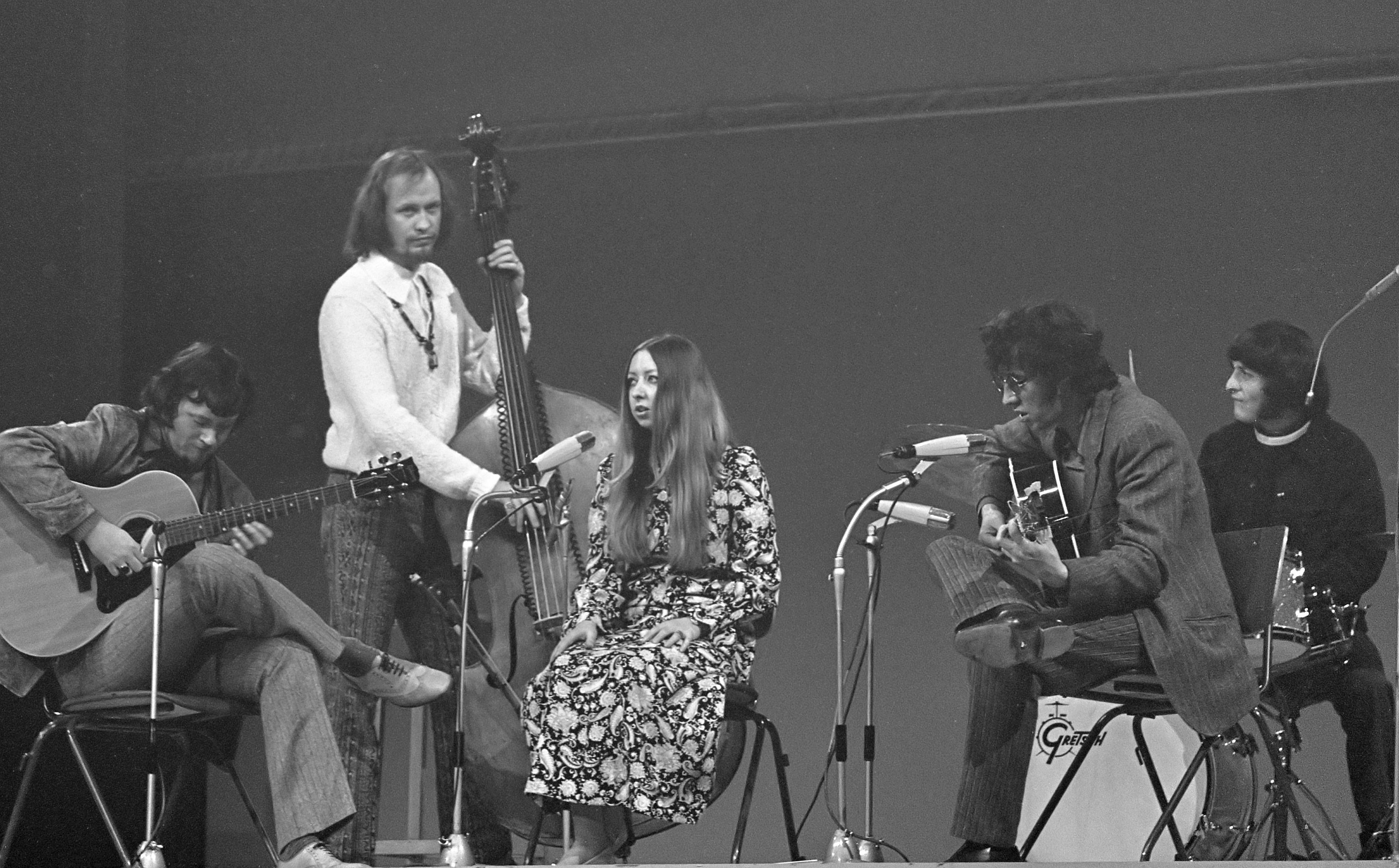
Pentangle in Amsterdam, 1969. Left to right: Renbourn; Danny Thompson, bass; Jacqui McShee, vocals; Bert Jansch, guitar and vocals, and Terry Cox, percussion.

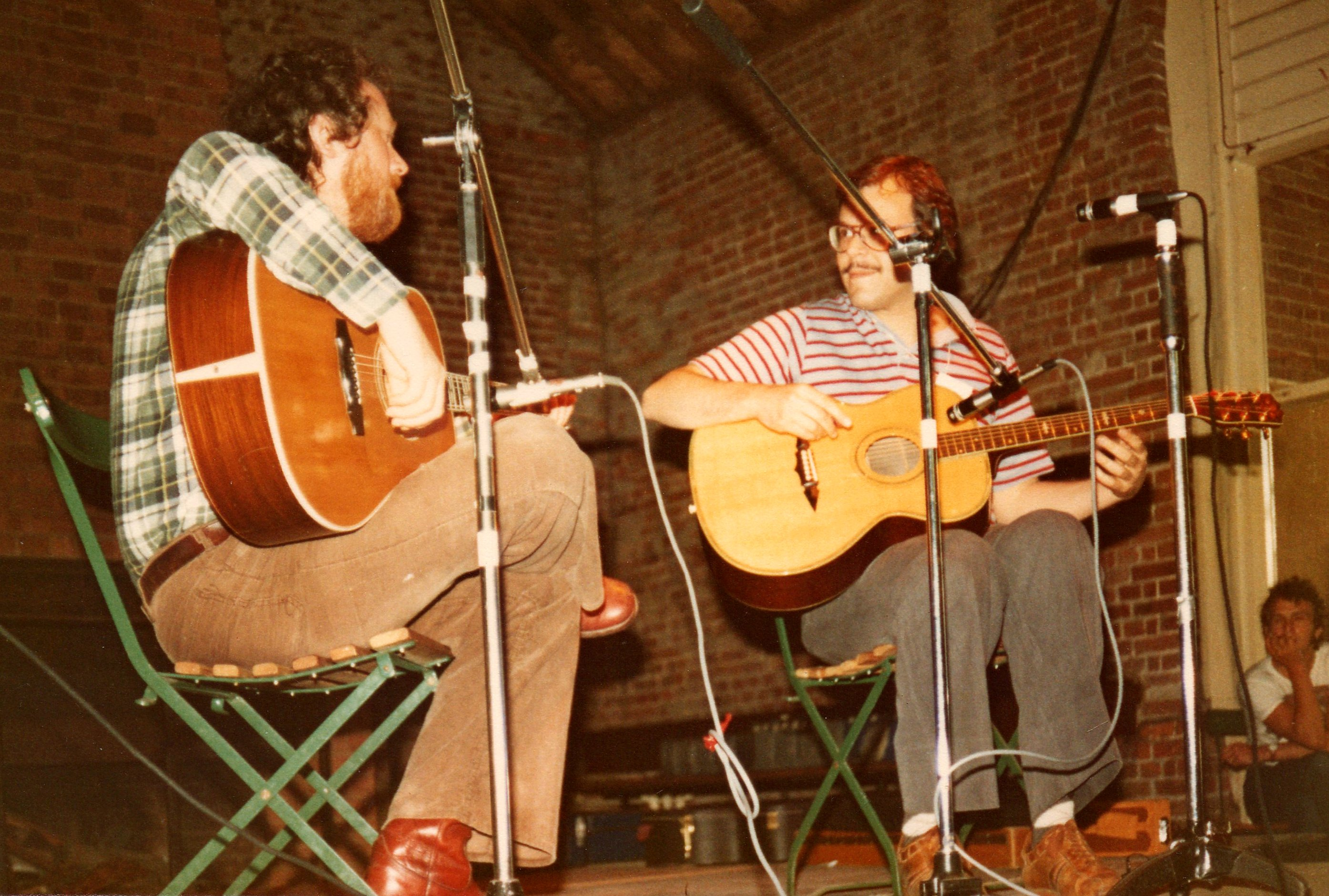
Renbourn (left) and Stefan Grossman on stage at the 1978 Norwich Folk Festival

John Renbourn studied classical guitar at school and it was during this period that he was introduced to early music. In the 1950s, along with many others, he was greatly influenced by the musical craze of skiffle and this eventually led him to explore the work of artists such as Lead Belly, Josh White and Big Bill Broonzy.

In the 1960s, the new craze in popular music was Rhythm and Blues, also the impact of Davey Graham was being felt. In 1961, Renbourn toured the South West with Mac MacLeod and repeated the tour in 1963. On returning from the South West Renbourn and MacLeod recorded a demo tape together. Renbourn briefly played in an R&B band while studying at the Kingston College of Art in London. Although the British folk revival was underway, most folk clubs were biased towards traditional, unaccompanied folk songs, and guitar players were not always welcome. However, the Roundhouse in London had a more tolerant attitude and here, John Renbourn joined blues and gospel singer Dorris Henderson, playing backing guitar and recording two albums with her.

Possibly the best known London venue for contemporary folk music in the early 1960s was Les Cousins on Greek Street, Soho, which became the main meeting place for guitar players and contemporary singer-songwriters from Britain and America. Around 1963, Renbourn teamed up with guitarist Bert Jansch who had moved to London from Edinburgh, and together they developed an intricate duet style that became known as folk baroque. Their album Bert and John is a fine example of their playing.

Renbourn released several albums on the Transatlantic label during the 1960s. Two of them, Sir John Alot and Lady and the Unicorn, sum up Renbourn's playing style and material from this period. Sir John Alot has a mixture of jazz/blues/folk playing alongside a more classical/early music style. Lady and the Unicorn is heavily influenced by Renbourn's interest in early music.

At around that time Renbourn also started playing and recording with Jacqui McShee, who sang traditional English folk songs, and with American fiddler Sue Draheim. In 1967, Renbourn, Jansch, McShee, bassist Danny Thompson, and drummer Terry Cox formed the band Pentangle. The group became successful, touring America in 1968, playing at Carnegie Hall and the Newport Folk Festival.

Renbourn went on to record more solo albums in the 1970s and 1980s. Much of the music is based on traditional material with a Celtic influence, interwoven with other styles. He also collaborated with American guitarist Stefan Grossman in the late 1970s, recording two albums with him, which at times recall his folk baroque days with Bert Jansch.

In the mid-1980s Renbourn went back to university, to earn a degree in composition at Dartington College of Arts. Subsequently, he focused mainly on writing classical music, while still performing in folk settings. He also added acoustic guitars for the movie soundtrack Scream for Help, a studio project with his neighbour John Paul Jones.

In 1988, Renbourn briefly formed a group called Ship of Fools with Tony Roberts (flute), Maggie Boyle (lyrics, miscellaneous instruments) and Steve Tilston (guitar). They recorded one eponymous album together. After practising by mailing tapes to each other in England, they held their first concert, comprising two sold-out shows, at Harvard's Hasty Pudding Club Theater. Regrettably, the soundboard bootleg tape was not saved due to a dispute between the concert promoter and the audio engineer.

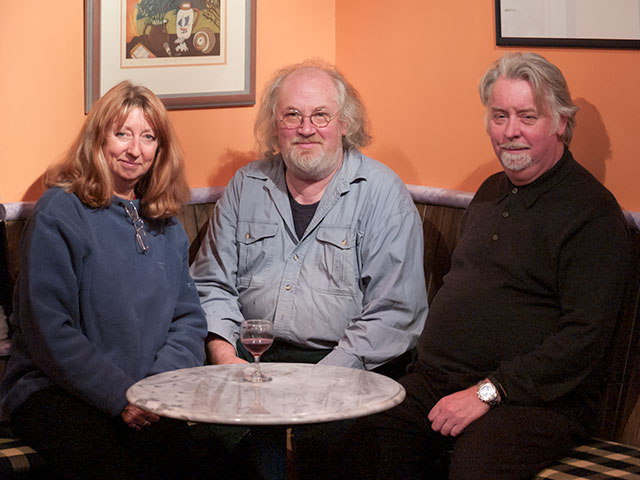
Jacqui McShee, John Renbourn and Wynd Theatre owner Felix Sear on 8 November 2003

Renbourn continued to record and tour. He toured the US with Archie Fisher. In 2005 he toured Japan (his fifth tour of that country) with Tokio Uchida and Woody Mann. In 2006 he played at number of venues in England, including the Green Man Festival in Wales and appearances with Robin Williamson and with Jacqui McShee. In the same year, he was working on a new solo album and collaborated with Clive Carroll on the score for the film Driving Lessons, directed by Jeremy Brock.

In 2011, he released Palermo Snow, a collection of instrumental guitar solos also featuring clarinetist Dick Lee. The title track is a complex mix of classical, folk, jazz and blues. This piece is a departure, in that there is a classical core, with other styles intermixing, rather than the core style being blues, folk or jazz.

Since 2012, he had toured with Wizz Jones, playing a mixture of solo and duo material. Renbourn previously appeared on Jones's album Lucky the Man (2001) with other former members of Pentangle. In 2016, an album by the pair, titled Joint Control, was released.

Renbourn died on 26 March 2015 from a heart attack at his home in the Borthwick valley near Hawick in the Scottish Borders, aged 70.
