= Alan Tunbridge =

English painter

Alan Tunbridge is an English artist, book dust-jacket illustrator and songwriter.

== Life and work ==
Normally painting in oils, Alan Tunbridge has also designed a great number of book dust-jacket illustrations, mainly in Scraperboard.

Many of his songs have been recorded by the folk and Country blues singer and guitarist Wizz Jones. With Jones, Tunbridge ran the MOJO Folk club at the King's Arms pub in Putney, South London in the early 1960s. Often he wrote the words spontaneously to Wizz Jones' chord sequences. His songs are also in the repertoires of Ralph McTell, John Renbourn, Maggie Holland and others. McTell was inspired by Tunbridge's lyrics of the evocative "National Seven" to tread the road which bears this name down to the south of France. The title of Bert Jansch's biography Dazzling Stranger originated from the title of a Tunbridge song.

Tunbridge spent a number of years studying the teachings of the mystic G. I. Gurdjieff (the Fourth Way) with John G. Bennett at Coombe Springs, and later spent time with the Sufi teacher Idries Shah. In 1997 Tunbridge contributed illustrations to Shah's collection of folktales, World Tales, illustrating the story of Mushkil Gusha.

He lived in Sydney, Australia, for many years. He no longer writes songs. From 1999 to 2009 he focused on using his writing and design skills to help develop the Schizophrenia Research Institute in Australia, of which he was a founding Director. This commitment was undertaken because his eldest son became affected by the illness. He retired from this role in 2009 to pursue his painting activities and to write his autobiography, Noose of Light, which was published in 2015. He now lives in Ubud, Bali.

== Recorded songs ==
Alan Tunbridge's recorded songs include:

- Shall I Wake You From Your Sleep?
- A Common Or Garden Mystery
- I've Got A Woman With One Leg
- Oh My Friend
- Can't Stop Thinkin' About It †
- At The Junction
- I Wanna' See The Manager
- Dazzling Stranger
- See How the Time is Flying
- The Legendary Me
- When I Cease to Care
- Nobody Told You So
- Beggar Man
- Slow Down to My Speed
- Stick a Little Label on It
- Which of Them You Love the Best
- City of the Angels
- The Raven †
- Find a Man for You Girl
- Mary Go 'Round
- Deep Water †
- When You're Gone
- Pictures
- Magical Flight
- National Seven
- Second-Hand Mini-Me
- Spoonful †
- The Grapes of Life
- Shall I Wake You
- Massacre at Béziers
- Teapot Blues †
- Earls Court Breakdown

† jointly with Wizz Jones
