= Breakup =

Termination of an intimate relationship

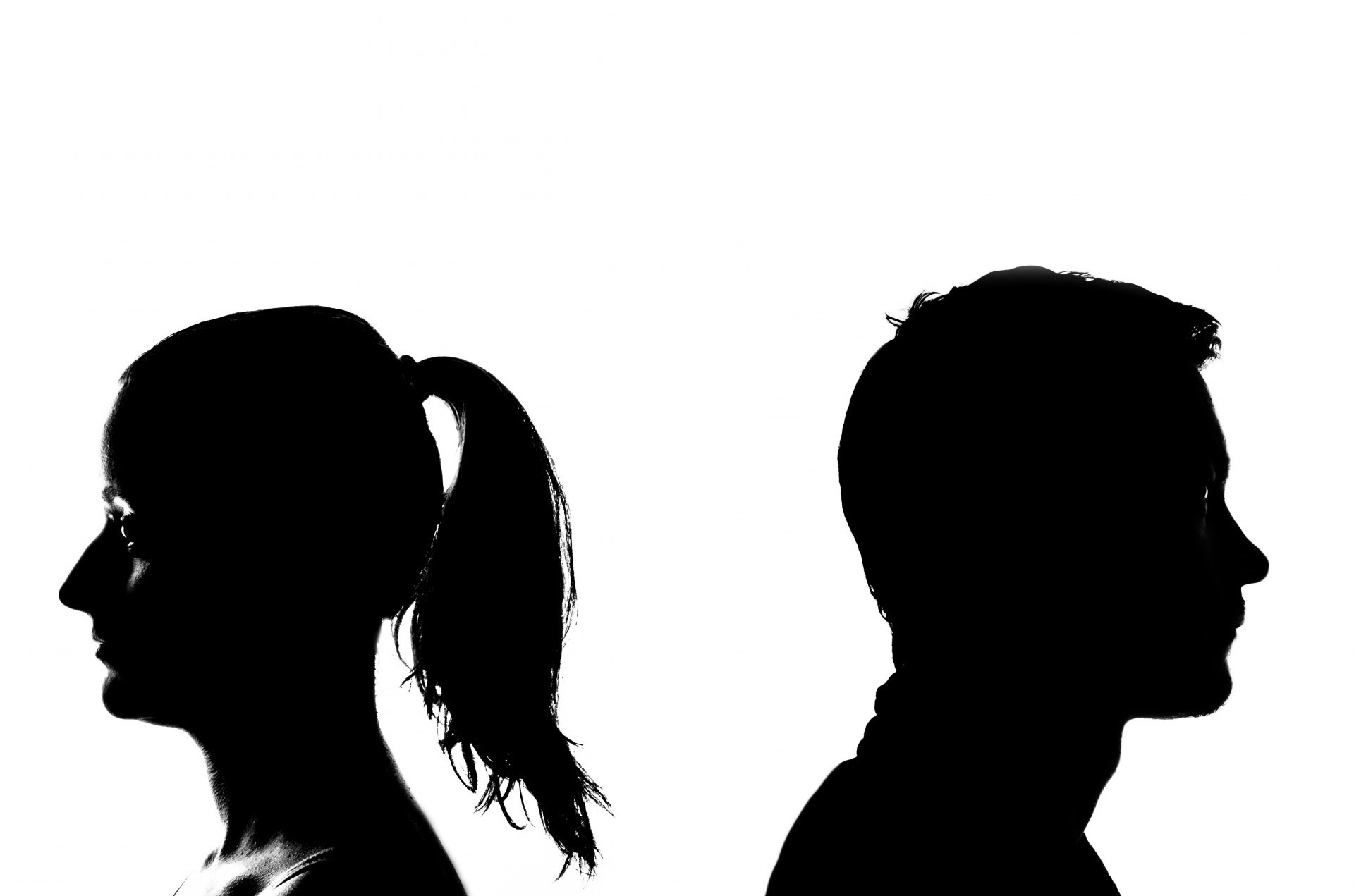
A photo representing a breakup of a heterosexual relationship

A relationship breakup, breakup, or break-up is the ending of a relationship. The act is commonly termed "dumping [someone]" in slang when it is initiated by one partner. The term is less likely to be applied to a married couple, where a breakup is typically called a separation or divorce. When a couple engaged to be married breaks up, it is typically called a "broken engagement". People commonly think of breakups in a romantic aspect, however, there are also non-romantic and platonic breakups, and this type of relationship dissolution is usually caused by failure to maintain a friendship.

Psychotherapist Susie Orbach (1992) has argued that the dissolution of dating and cohabiting relationships can be as painful as or more painful than divorce because these nonmarital relationships are less socially recognized.

Kamiar-K. Rueckert argues with the works of Donald Winnicott that the ability to be alone is an essentially healthy sign of emotional development and maturity. Once a child has obtained closeness and attachment by their early caregivers, they are able to develop autonomy and identity. If children have not introjected the good and protective qualities of their parents, they will fear separation and break-ups.

== Models ==
Several psychological models have been proposed to explain the process of a relationship breakup, many suggesting that relationship dissolution occurs in stages.

Mark L. Knapp, a foundational scholar on the subject of interpersonal relationships, created a model called Knapp's relational development model. He describes two separate phases of relationships, coming together and coming apart.

The coming together phase is meant to be long-term, beginning in the initiation phase and becoming deeper with time and intimacy. In the coming apart phase, differentiating begins. This is when the individuals began noticing differences that may seem unnegotiable or place pressure on the relationship. This leads to circumscribing where the individuals begin to pull apart, set boundaries, and have their own independent lives. This may cause issues to arise. At this point, the relationship reaches stagnation where the couple stays together for other reasons rather than their will to do so. Examples include children. The next stage is avoidance in which the individuals try to stay away from each other as much as possible. They, then, reach termination, where the relationship is over and they go their separate ways.

=== Stages leading to a breakup ===
L. Lee proposes that there are five stages ultimately leading up to a breakup.

1. Dissatisfaction: one or both partners grow dissatisfied with relationship
2. Exposure: both partners mutually become aware of problems in relationship
3. Negotiation: both partners attempt to negotiate solutions to problems
4. Resolution and transformation: both partners apply outcome of their negotiation
5. Termination: proposed resolution fails to rectify issues and no further solutions are accepted or applied

=== Cycle of a breakup ===
Steve Duck outlines a six-stage cycle of relationship breakup:

1. Dissatisfaction with relationship
2. Social withdrawal
3. Discussion of reasons for discontentment
4. Going public
5. Tidying up of memories
6. Recreating sense of social value

=== Factors that predict a breakup before marriage ===
Hill, Rubin and Peplau identify five factors that predict breakup before marriage:

1. Unequal involvement in the relationship
2. Age difference
3. Different educational aspirations
4. Difference in intelligence
5. Difference in physical attractiveness

=== Cascade Model of Relational Dissolution ===
Gottman and Levenson (1994) outline the Cascade Model of Relational Dissolution, in which four negative nonverbal behaviors lead to the breakdown of a marriage/relationship:

1. Criticism
2. Defensiveness
3. Contempt
4. Stonewalling
5. Suspicious

== Uncoupling theory ==
In 1976, sociologist Diane Vaughan proposed an "uncoupling theory", where there exists a "turning point" in the dynamics of relationship breakup – 'a precise moment when they "knew the relationship was over," when "everything went dead inside"' – followed by a transition period in which one partner unconsciously knows the relationship is going to end, but holds on to it for an extended period, even for years.

Vaughan considered that the process of breakup was asymmetrical for initiator and respondent: the former 'has begun mourning the loss of the relationship and has undertaken something tantamount to a rehearsal, mentally and, to varying degrees, experientially, of a life apart from the partner'. The latter then has to play catch-up: 'to make their own transition out of the relationship, partners must redefine initiator and relationship negatively, legitimating the dissolution'.

As a result, for Vaughan 'getting out of a relationship includes a redefinition of self at several levels: in the private thoughts of the individual, between partners, and in the larger social context in which the relationship exists'. She considered that 'uncoupling is complete when the partners have defined themselves and are defined by others as separate and independent of each other – when being partners is no longer a major source of identity'.

== Conscious uncoupling ==
Katherine Woodward Thomas, a licensed marriage and family therapist, originated the term "conscious uncoupling" in 2009. Thomas began teaching this new approach to divorce to students throughout the world.

The term received popularization by Gwyneth Paltrow, who used the phrase to describe her divorce with Chris Martin. Paltrow had her doctors Dr. Sherry Sami, and Habib Sadeghi and his wife explain conscious uncoupling when she first made the news of her divorce public. "A conscious uncoupling is the ability to understand that every irritation and argument [within a marriage] was a signal to look inside ourselves and identify a negative internal object that needed healing," Habib Sadeghi explained. "From this perspective, there are no bad guys, just two people, it's about people as individuals, not just the relationship".

== Consequences ==
Depending on the individual, breakups can be stressful, unpleasant, and traumatic events. Both parties could feel a large number of negative effects as a result of the relationship's dissolution, and these events often gain the reputation for being some of the worst events in people's lives. These could include psychological distress symptoms, grief reactions, an overall decline in psychological well-being, and potential stalking behaviors. Individuals often work hard to keep their relationships intact because of how significantly distressing and problematic these negative effects can be, even in the face of potential complications in their relationship, for as long as they can bear it.

=== Negative effects ===
==== Psychological distress symptoms ====
Individuals who had just recently experienced the dissolution of a romantic relationship reported several symptoms of acute psychological distress. These included flashback and intrusive memories associated with their partner, often triggered by important dates associated with either the relationship or the breakup. These intrusive distress symptoms manifested in various ways for both the individual who initiated the breakup and their partner, such as being reminded of certain aspects of their behavior or their preferences.

Another set of psychological distress symptoms that were reported by individuals who had experienced a romantic relationship breakup fell under the category of avoidance behavior. Being without their partner causes their self-concept to shift as they struggle through emotional distress. This involves an active attempt at denying or ignoring the circumstances of the current situation, or those that led to the dissolution of the relationship. In relation to this, individuals also noted feeling numb and uninterested with the world around them because of the breakup.

The combination of this desire to engage in avoidance behaviors and the intrusive memories that may naturally come up cause individuals to feel significant emotional swings and outbursts in the form of irritation, anger, and startle responses. Individuals were noted as being far more paranoid, suspicious, and jealous, often tied towards a desire to know information about their ex-partner.

Overall, these psychological distress symptoms come together to result in a significantly lower level of self-esteem among individuals who have just undergone the dissolution of a romantic relationship. Additionally, individuals undergo a significant redefinition of their self-concept, as they attempt to understand who they are without their ex-partner. This compounds upon the psychological distress symptoms that they feel from the loss of the relationship and is the most significant negative effect that people undergoing a breakup experience.

==== Grief reactions ====
A natural effect of the loss of a relationship that an individual had hoped to keep is grief, because the desire to keep relationships intact despite problems and complications is a natural human desire. This results in individuals undergoing a breakup displaying grief reactions that include symptoms like sleeplessness, depression, and suicidal thoughts. This tendency to express grief and depression is so prevalent that researchers point to it being a significant contributor to the first onset of major depressive disorder in young adults.

The extent of these grief reactions is not limited to the time frame immediately following the dissolution of the romantic relationship. Even some time after the breakup, people who are asked to recall depressing or negative events in their lives commonly make reference to traumatic events of this nature. This negative effect can be attributed to the severity of the grief reaction that people who suffer through a breakup display, making a significant mark in their lives that they are unlikely to forget.

==== Decline in psychological well-being ====
In addition to these specific negative effects, individuals who are suffering through a breakup report a general decline in their psychological well-being. The general negative emotion that they feel often triggers other behaviors and habits that are either detrimental to their mental health or signify poor mental health conditions. These include:

- increased alcohol use
- weight loss
- worsening physical health
- admissions to psychiatric services
- increased criminal behavior
- increased risk of suicide
- negative emotions and feelings (such as guilt, anger, or rejection)

==== Stalking behaviors ====
Following a breakup, one partner may attempt to maintain contact with the other, even when this is unwanted. Stalking can be said to occur when there is a persistent pattern of unwanted behavior that is perceived as harassing or sinister. There is no clear definition of stalking behavior that differentiates it from socially acceptable activities. This type of behavior exists on a scale, that stretches from an amicable breakup with no unwanted harassment behaviors all the way to stalking behaviors that are threatening and distressful to the partner being stalked. Stalking stems from a dissatisfaction with the circumstances following a breakup, as well as a misguided or clinically delusional belief that the stalking behavior may result in the reforming of the relationship.

=== Positive effects ===
Evidence shows that even in the direst of situations, there is a chance for positive emotions and growth. Breakups are no different, giving those affected opportunities for stress-related growth, improving their performance in future relationships, and providing feelings of relief and freedom. Jessica Kansky and Joseph P. Allen conducted a study that followed 160 20 to 25-year-olds, or emerging adults, and observed their romantic and close friend relationships. There were a significant number of findings, but one finding was that the experience of a break-up did prove positive in the long run for several individuals, especially if they knew the reason(s) the relationship ended.

==== Stress-related growth ====
Individuals that are placed under stressful situations are often faced with an opportunity for growth and development as a result of this stress. Without this push to improve, individuals are often pushed towards complacency and refuse to make the necessary efforts to progress through life. Different ways in which people have exhibited growth following a stressful life event include improvements to the way a person views themselves, the way they connect with other people around them, or their overall approach to life. Research shows that breakups are highly representative of this type of stressful situation, as individuals experience them several times throughout their lives and have been known to self-report instances of growth because of the experience.

==== Improved future relationships ====
Another positive outcome that has been observed to follow breakup has to do with the lessons that people may have learned from going through the painful experience. The stress-related growth that a person is forced to experience following a breakup causes improvements to their overall character, self-image, and ability to interact with others. These improvements have the potential to improve the quality of future romantic relationships with other people. This is due to the increased level of maturity displayed by the individual as well as, to a lesser extent, insight into certain things that they must avoid in a relationship to ensure better relationships in the future.

==== Feelings of relief and freedom ====
While this may not necessarily be a universal positive consequence that affects all people going through a breakup, there is significant evidence towards certain individuals experiencing feelings of relief, freedom, and happiness following the end of a relationship. There is a high likelihood that these individuals were the one who initiated the breakup in the first place, but research has shown that there have been cases where individuals that have been victims of a breakup recognize that their past relationship was sub-optimal, which allows them to display the same emotions of relief, freedom, and happiness.

=== Mitigating factors ===
While individuals that have experienced a breakup are likely to experience a number of different positive and negative effects once the relationship has run its course, different people can expect these to manifest in varying degrees. This is because there are several mitigating factors that can either minimize or amplify the extent to which one feels the consequences of a breakup. The list of potential factors that have been shown to moderate the effects that an individual might feel are categorized and listed below:

- Relationship quality
  - Duration of relationship – longer relationships are more likely to be more painful after the breakup
  - Admission of love for ex-partner – relationships that report to be filled with love may exacerbate the consequences that victims feel following a breakup
  - Satisfaction levels of both parties – relationships that report both parties feeling satisfied are more likely to suffer during breakups
  - Level of investment in maintaining the relationship – high levels of relationship investment translate to a much larger loss caused by the dissolution of the romantic relationship
  - Proportion of positive and negative relationship memories – individuals that had a high number of positive relationship memories were less negatively affected by the breakup when compared to those that would constantly dredge up negative memories of their ex-partner
- Romantic situation following breakup
  - Ease of finding an alternative partner – being able to find a new partner immediately following a breakup allowed the individual to better weather the negative emotions and problems associated with the dissolution of a romantic relationship
  - Willingness to begin a new relationship – an openness to the formation of a new relationship was shown to translate to a lower level of victimization and negative consequences after a breakup
- Circumstances of the breakup
  - Initiator of the dissolution of the relationship – while both the initiator and the victim were shown to experience consequences following the breakup, the former displayed less of these symptoms and in some cases experienced positive effects because the relationship ended
  - Certainty of the reasons for the breakup – being unsure about the initiator's reasons for breaking up caused higher levels of anxiety and other stress symptoms in the victim, while achieving closure was an important step for most individuals seeking to move on from a breakup
- Characteristics of the participants
  - Hardiness – individuals that displayed above average levels of hardiness were unfazed by the dissolution of their romantic relationship and were less likely to be bothered by its consequences
- Attachment styles can play a big role in why a breakup occurs in the first place. Attachment styles define the expectations an individual has when in a relationship based on the relationship they had with their caregivers during childhood. The four attachment styles are Avoidant Attachment ( which is characterized by avoiding communication and withdrawing), Anxious / Ambivalent Attachment ( which is characterized by fear that a partner will not reciprocate the same love that the individual gives), Fearful Avoidant (Disorganized) Attachment (which is characterized by a fear of relationships and attempts to avoid them even while craving love and intimacy), and Secure Attachment (which is the style that is characterized by strong, healthy relationships). These attachment styles can affect the behavior of one partner towards another and different attachment styles can clash. For instance, if one partner has an avoidant attachment and dates someone with a secure attachment style, the two partners may clash due to a lack of communication and several misunderstandings as these attachment styles come with expectations that are acted out in behavior that can eventually lead to a breakup.
  - Self-esteem levels – high levels of self-esteem allow people to be less stressed during the dissolution of a relationship and alleviate the most severe negative consequences
  - Mental health – individuals that display lower levels of mental health and substance abuse have reported magnified consequence levels when going through the breakup process
  - Self-complexity – people that exhibit a complex self-image, which references an ability to perceive oneself as more than just who they are in their romantic relationship, are less likely to be debilitated by the consequences of a breakup
  - Sex – several studies observed that females on average exhibited larger negative symptoms during the breakup process
- Implementation of coping strategies
  - Distancing – avoiding the problem has been observed to translate to negative coping outcomes and a worsening of the consequences reported by the victim, while a willingness to confront the matter and engage in problem solving has shown overall mitigative effects to breakup consequences
  - Benefit-finding – the willingness to objectively assess the relationship, as well as an ability to find benefits that resulted from its ending allowed victims to display less stress symptoms during the breakup
  - Perceived social support – individuals that felt like people in their social group were on their side and would support them during this stressful time reported being less affected by the breakup and loss of a romantic relationship

== Online breakups ==
The technologically advanced society that currently exists means that much of people's lives are online. People can date online via dating apps or using social media platforms such as Instagram or Facebook. Many relationships have been able to manifest from mediated communication and last a similar amount of time as relationships that were started in person. Others, however, have not been as long-lived. The presence of social media and technology also plays a part in relationships that began and exist in person, as well. There has been much controversy about the stress that online dating places on relationships. The constant and wide range of accessibility provided by technology and internet access can lead to a plethora of issues that may result in break-ups. An example of this is that those already in a relationship can have multiple partners that are also dating using online platforms that have no knowledge of each other due to the unlimited access they have to meet people from all over the world. Once a partner discovers the infidelity, this could result in a breakup. Online dating may also prohibit choices that could save a relationship.

== LGBTQ relationship dissolutions ==
While public opinion has become more accepting of different forms of relationships, including those that are not heterosexual, many LGBTQ couples face adversity when it comes to maintaining their relationships due to societal-based homophobia. According to researchers Lahti and Kolehmainen, studies have shown that LGBTQ couples tend to feel pressured by society to maintain long, monogamous, and healthy relationships. They may struggle in silence and refuse to seek help or end a relationship when it may be in their best interest mentally and emotionally because of this pressure. Their studies also indicate that most counseling services, or other means of salvaging a relationship, have heteronormative assumptions. This makes it difficult for LGBTQ couples to find help for their relationships that caters to the issues they struggle with personally.

Other unique issues arise out of LGBTQ relationship dissolutions when children are involved. According to researchers Goldberg and Allen, LGBTQ separations involving children can become legally confusing. In lesbian relationships, there are two mothers, so the question arises of who would receive full custody of the child(ren). Many times, the court system favors the birth mother, however, in lesbian relationships, one mother could carry the egg of another, so it becomes challenging to determine who the child(ren) biologically belongs to. In gay male relationship dissolutions, this also causes confusion as the majority of gay male parents adopted their children. Due to the heteronormative society that currently exists, LGBTQ couples often deal with challenges post-break-up.

There is a lack of research on LGBTQ relationship dissolutions as these relationships are fairly recent to acceptance and legality in history.

== See also ==
- Broken heart
- Common-law marriage
- Defriend
- Divorce
- Emotional baggage
- Five stages of grief
- Human bonding
- John Gottman
- Legal separation
- Marital separation
- Palimony in the United States
- Resignation
- Takotsubo cardiomyopathy
- Torch song
- Unrequited love
