= Gen Z stare =

Staring behaviour associated with Generation Z

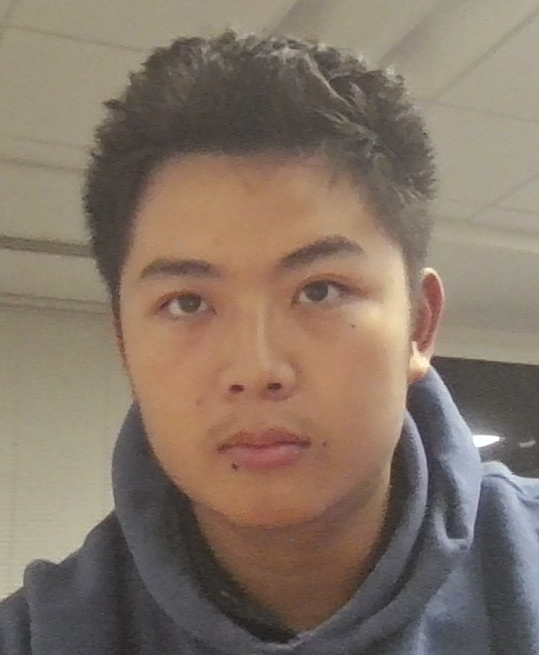
- A member of Generation Z performing the stare
- Years active: Term coined in the summer of 2024
- Influences: Social media; Generational gap; COVID-19 pandemic

The Gen Z stare is a generally pejorative phrase coined by social media users to describe a blank stare that members of younger generations such as Generation Z are claimed to do.

The term "Gen Z stare" garnered widespread coverage in the mainstream media in July 2025. (Note: Attributed to multiple sources:) The concept of the "Gen Z stare" was first explored in research conducted by Kaiden Jones, who proposed that while the stare shares some similarities with the nonverbal responses of both deadpan humor and stonewalling, it can signal social critique and a refusal to conform to social scripts.

== Description ==
According to Dani Di Placido, writing for Forbes, some TikTok users believe that many members of Generation Z have difficulty with small talk and fundamental social courtesies. This is often described as a blank stare that they give to some questions that are asked. Placido also says that according to TikTok users, this stare is most common during customer service interactions.

Kalhan Rosenblatt of NBC News says, "[w]hile there are several definitions for the stare, the most common meaning is a vacant expression a Gen Zer gives in response to a question. The stare occurs in classrooms, restaurants, at work and more settings."

Similarly, some servers and bartenders have said that their Gen Z customers respond to pleasant questions or pleasant conversation with a long gaze or a "stare" instead of speaking. Additionally, some TikTokers say that Gen Z employees do not greet customers or complete basic requests and instead return a blank stare. In a New York Times article in 2025, one interviewee said the attitude and stare indicate a "complete lack of fucks", adding that the stare has both supporters and detractors. Generation Z-ers do not agree on an exact definition. Professors have reported encountering the stare in college classrooms when trying to elicit engagement from students.

== Possible causes ==
Regarding the possible root causes of the Gen Z stare, a University of Alabama professor said the look became more prevalent on campus following the COVID-19 lockdowns, noticing an "increasing amount of silence" after asking questions in class. The stare may be an expression of authentic boredom and resistance to "performative positivity." Suzy Welch, an NYU business professor, argued the stare could be coming from Gen Z members ranking "achievement" as a bottom-tier value, linking the stare to quiet quitting. While deadpan has been around for generations, the blank stare might also be a manifestation of social anxiety developed during the enforced isolation of the COVID pandemic period. Social isolation during the pandemic led to increased mental health issues for many students, such as anxiety and depression. When offline interactions were scarce, social media filled a socialization gap. The influence of social media has also led to a fear of being judged or "cancelled" online. Not wanting to be "cringe" is additionally a common theme.

== See also ==
- Dumb insolence
- Millennial pause
- Resting bitch face
