= Millennial pause =

Hesitation before beginning a video

The millennial pause is a pause in speaking at the start of some videos, especially in short-form content and on social media apps such as TikTok. The pause is generally ascribed to millennials. The phenomenon is an example of the digital generation gap between millennials and subsequent generations.

== Observation ==
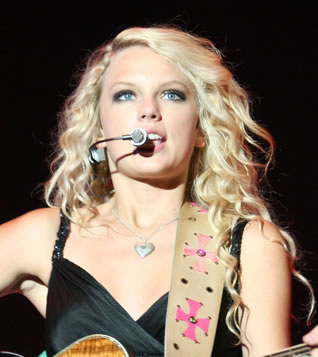
In mainstream media, millennial pauses were first noted in videos posted by Taylor Swift, a member of the millennial generation.

The term "millennial pause" is attributed to TikTok user nisipisa, a millennial who posted a TikTok video on 26 November 2021, pointing out that Taylor Swift, a millennial singer, includes such pauses at the start of her videos. Kate Lindsay of The Atlantic, a millennial, stated that this pause is becoming more noticeable as short-form videos are becoming more prevalent on the social network Instagram, instant messaging app Snapchat, and online video platform YouTube.

Videos by people other than millennials have also been described as exhibiting a millennial pause; Parade reported that singer JC Chasez included one in his TikTok debut video, and James Factora of Them mentioned how actress Jennifer Coolidge included one in "a perfect TikTok" during her debut. (Note: JC Chasez was born in 1976. Definitions of "millennial" often include people born in the 1980s, but not those in the 1970s. Jennifer Coolidge was born in 1961.)

== Hypothesis ==
It has been conjectured that the reason why people older than zoomers tend to include a pause at the start of their videos is to make sure that the device they are using is actually recording before beginning to say anything. In contrast, younger users either test the device before recording or trust that the devices are working correctly, and begin speaking immediately after the recording begins.

Another theory is that the habit may have been adopted when earlier recording devices, such as cassette recorders or VHS camcorders, commonly took a split second before beginning to record. Although newer devices do not exhibit the same delay, this habit has proven hard to break.

=== Gen Z shake ===
On 18 January 2023, a Gen Z user of TikTok posted a video describing how members of Generation Z often start recording their videos right before placing their cameras on a stable surface. As a result, the video shakes at the start of these recordings before the camera is set down.

== Awareness ==
Becoming aware of the phenomenon has made some millennials notice that they are "getting old". People have also noted that, once they have been made aware that their recordings include millennial pauses, they find their own habit embarrassing, yet still have trouble breaking the habit. Some people have stated that, without the pause, the start of their dialogue would be cut off.

The phrase has been used untranslated outside of the Anglosphere, including in Brazil, Chile, Denmark, France, Germany, Indonesia, Italy, Mexico, the Netherlands, and Spain. (Note: Spanish newspaper El País used a Spanish translation, calling it "la pausa millennial", though it also mentioned the English-language hashtag "#MillennialPause", and used the phrase untranslated in its English-language edition.)

== See also ==
- Digital literacy
- Millennial economics
- Millennial politics
- Millennial optimism
- Gen Z stare
