= Julie Schwartz Gottman =

American psychologist (born 1951)

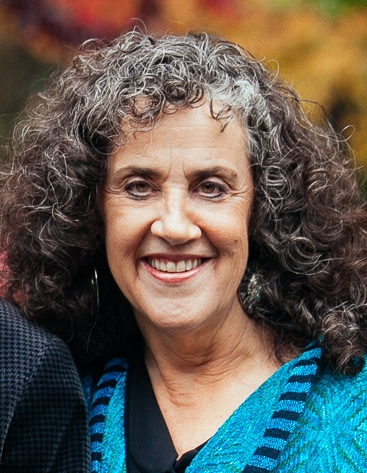
- Born: April 7, 1951 (age 75); Portland, Oregon, U.S.
- Education: California School of Professional Psychology (MA, PhD); Northeastern University (MEd); Colorado College (BA)
- Occupations: Psychologist; Researcher; Author; Public speaker; Therapist
- Spouse: John Gottman
- Website: www.gottman.com

Julie Schwartz Gottman (born April 7, 1951) is an American clinical psychologist, researcher, speaker and author. Together with her husband and collaborator, John Gottman, she is the co-founder of The Gottman Institute – an organization dedicated to strengthening relationships through research-based products and programs. She is the co-creator of the Sound Relationship House Theory, Gottman Method Couples Therapy, and The Art and Science of Love weekend workshop for couples, among other programs.

== Early life and education ==
Julie Schwartz Gottman was born in Portland, Oregon, the daughter of Marvin and Selma Schwartz. She completed her Bachelor of Arts (B.A.) in psychology at Colorado College in 1974. In the years following college, she completed an MEd in community mental health counseling from Northeastern University Graduate School of Education in 1976 and later, lived in India and Nepal for a year that included serving people in poverty in Calcutta. After returning to the U.S. in 1979, she earned a Master of Arts (MA) in Clinical psychology in 1981 and PhD from the California School of Professional Psychology (CSPP), San Diego in 1985.

== Career ==
Julie Schwartz Gottman began her professional career while at college, where she helped establish a counseling center for rape survivors, combat veterans, and others in need. After moving to Boston, she worked with patients who had schizophrenia or heroin addiction in a Massachusetts General Hospital outpatient program in the Boston "combat zone." Between 1976 and 1978, she served as psychiatric staff at the University of Oregon Medical Center Psychiatric Crisis Unit where she continued to treat impoverished individuals with serious mental illnesses.

After returning from India, her clinical work included residential treatment for young adults with schizophrenia, and individual and group work with incest survivors. She later specialized in working with low-income clients, incest and sexual assault survivors, combat veterans, and cancer patients and their families. In 1983, she helped to develop and implement a program to treat and prevent sexual harassment on campus at the University of California at San Diego.

During the 1980s, she conducted research that compared the effects of lesbian and heterosexual mother's parenting of now adult-aged daughters to examine the commonly held judicial position that children of lesbian mothers should be removed from them for their own well-being. Prior to this study, no adults raised by lesbian mothers had been scientifically studied. No significant differences were found in sexual orientation, gender identity, or social adjustment between daughters either raised by lesbian or heterosexual mothers. As a result of this research, she has served as an expert witness in lesbian mothers' court custody disputes, and her practice includes seeing women and men of any sexual orientation.

In 1996, Julie Schwartz Gottman co-founded The Gottman Institute in Seattle with John Gottman. She served as the Clinical Director from 1996 to 2001 and CEO from 1999 to 2001. She currently serves as President of the organization. She helped design and direct the "Couples Together Against Violence" research study to develop an evidence-based group therapy method for treating domestic violence. She also created and served as the Clinical Director of "Loving Couples Loving Children," a national program for treating couples in poverty that was tested with over 3,000 couples.

She has offered scores of talks and workshops over the years for Evolution of Psychotherapy Conferences, Psychotherapy Networker Symposiums, American Psychological Association (APA) annual conferences, and American Association of Marriage and Family Therapy (AAMFT) annual conferences. She has also taught in countries worldwide, including Turkey, South Korea, Japan, Australia, Norway, Iceland, Israel, Austria, and New Zealand.

Together with John Gottman, she has presented The Art and Science of Love weekend workshop to thousands of couples in Seattle, Washington and has trained more than 100,000 clinicians worldwide in Gottman Method Couples Therapy, a science-based approach that aims to increase respect, affection, and closeness, manage conflict, generate greater understanding, and create shared meaning in relationships.

She is the author or co-author of Ten Lessons to Transform Your Marriage (Three Rivers Press, 2006), And Baby Makes Three (Three Rivers Press, 2007), 10 Principles for Doing Effective Couples Therapy (W.W. Norton & Company, 2015), The Man's Guide to Women (Rodale, 2016), The Marriage Clinic Casebook (W.W. Norton & Company, 2004), and The Science of Couples and Family Therapy (W.W. Norton & Company, 2018). Her articles have appeared in many peer-reviewed journals and national media publications.

In December 2015, she appeared on Talks at Google on Modern Romance moderated by Logan Ury to discuss common misconceptions about relationships.

Gottman maintains a private practice on Orcas Island, where she specializes in working with distressed couples, abuse and trauma survivors, those with substance abuse problems and their partners, and cancer patients and their families. She also offers Marathon Therapy and Private Couples Retreats.

She is a member of the American Psychological Association, the National Organization for Women, and the Sierra Club.

== Honors and awards ==
In 2002, the Washington State Psychological Association (WSPA) honored Julie Schwartz Gottman with The Distinguished Psychologist of the Year Award. She also received the 2005 Certificate of Appreciation from the U.S. Army. Drs. John and Julie Gottman were named the "renowned experts on marital stability" by The Atlantic.

== Works ==
- Gottman, Julie Schwartz (1989). Children of Gay and Lesbian Parents, Marriage & Family Review, Vol. 14, No. 3-4, p. 172.
- Gottman, Julie Schwartz (2004). The Marriage Clinic Casebook. New York: W.W. Norton & Company. ISBN 9780393704136.
- Gottman, Julie Schwartz; Gottman, John; Joan DeClaire (2006). Ten Lessons to Transform Your Marriage: America's Love Lab Experts Share Their Strategies for Strengthening Your Relationship. New York: Three Rivers Press. ISBN 978-1400050192
- Anne Gartlan; Julie Schwartz Gottman; Joan Declaire (2006). Ten Lessons to Transform Your Marriage: America's Love Lab Experts Share Their Strategies for Strengthening Your Relationship. Random House Audio. ISBN 0-7393-3237-6.
- Gottman, Julie Schwartz; Gottman, John (2007). And Baby Makes Three: The Six-Step Plan for Preserving Marital Intimacy and Rekindling Romance After Baby Arrives. New York: Three Rivers Press. ISBN 1-4000-9738-X.
- Gottman, Julie Schwartz; Gottman, John (2015). 10 Principles for Doing Effective Couples Therapy. New York: W.W. Norton & Company. ISBN 978-0393708356
- Gottman, Julie Schwartz; Gottman, John; Abrams, Douglas; Abrams, Rachel Carlton (2016). The Man's Guide to Women. New York: Rodale. ISBN 978-1-62336-184-6.
- Gottman, Julie Schwartz; Gottman, John (2018). The Science of Couples and Family Therapy: Behind the Scenes at the "Love Lab" 1st Edition. New York: W.W. Norton & Company. ISBN 978-0393712742.
