= The Seven Principles for Making Marriage Work =

1999 book by John Gottman

- Author: John Gottman
- Language: English
- Subject: Relationships
- Published: March 16, 1999
- Pages: 271
- ISBN: 978-0609805794

The Seven Principles for Making Marriage Work is a 1999 book by John Gottman, which details seven principles for couples to improve their marriage and the "Four Horseman" to watch out for, that usually herald the end of a marriage. The book was based on Gottman's research in his Family Research Lab, known as the "Love Lab", where he observed more than 650 couples over 14 years.

== Overview ==
In The Seven Principles for Making Marriage Work, Gottman argues that the basis for a happy marriage is a deep friendship with mutual respect and a positive attitude. He also emphasizes the importance of emotional intelligence in couples.

In the course of the book, Gottman details seven principles for couples to follow in order to nurture their friendship and improve their marriage in order to help them endure during challenging times. These principles include: enhancing their "love maps"; nurturing their fondness and admiration; turning toward each other instead of away; letting their spouse influence them; solving their solvable problems; overcoming gridlock; and creating a shared sense of meaning.

Gottman also writes about the "Four Horseman" that are important to minimize and avoid: 1) criticism, 2) defensiveness, 3) contempt, and 4) stonewalling. Of these four, he warns that contempt is the highest predictor for divorce. He defines contempt as a spouse viewing themselves as better than the other spouse. Gottman defines criticism as verbally attacking a spouse's personality or character with criticism vs. a complaint (a healthy form of communication). Defensiveness he defines as victimizing the self to ward off perceived verbal attacks and blame the other partner. Finally, there's stonewalling, which Gottman says is withdrawal from interaction to avoid conflict. It manifests itself in the silent treatment, conveys disapproval of the other, and is an unwillingness to properly communicate during contention.

=== The seven principles ===
1. Share Love Maps: This is where all the information learned about our partners gets stored. One example of information gathered and stored is the things that they like and things that they dislike.

2. Nurture Your Fondness & Admiration: This is showing that you care about the other person and focusing on and acknowledging the positives. The basis for this starts in friendship.

3. Turn Towards Each Other Instead of Away: This is doing things together and showing the other person that they are valued. It is taking the time to listen and not telling them you don’t have time.

4. Let Your Partner Influence You: This is sharing the decision making and being willing to both make decisions and respect your partner's decisions.

5. Solve Your Solvable Problems: This is realizing which problems can be solved and solving them using skills for managing conflict, which include: using Softened Startup, Repair and De-escalation, Physiological Self-Soothing, Accepting What You Cannot Change, Accepting Influence, and Compromise.

6. Overcome Gridlock: This is figuring out what is causing a block in your life and taking steps to overcome this block. It does not necessarily mean fixing problems but taking steps to overcome them.

7. Create Shared Meaning: This is creating a life that is shared and meaningful for both of you. “Marriage isn’t about just raising kids, splitting chores, and making love. It can also have a spiritual dimension that has to do with creating an inner life together–a culture rich with symbols and rituals, and an appreciation for your roles and goals that link you, that lead you to understand what it means to be part of the family you have become” (Gottman & Silver, 1999).

== Reception ==
The book was released to generally favorable reviews. It was a New York Times bestseller, and was included in the U.S. Army's Comprehensive Soldier Fitness program. It has been included in numerous publications' lists of best relationship books. A 2001 study noted the book aligned with feminist principles and research stating that shared power is essential for a successful marriage.

== Criticism ==
Psychologist Milton Spett criticized Gottman's lack of scientific rigor in his claims of low relapse from his marital therapy: "Gottman makes these claims without reporting any of the standard techniques of outcome research: no control group, no random assignment to treatments, no blind assessment of outcome." Therapist Robert F. Scuka argued against Gottman's criticism of the effectiveness of active listening based on the Munich Marital Therapy Study, saying, "Gottman cites only certain (one-sided) results from the study."
