= Stonewalling =

Type of behavior in certain situations

Stonewalling is a refusal to communicate or cooperate. Such behaviour occurs in situations such as interpersonal relationships, marriage counselling, diplomatic negotiations, politics and legal cases. Body language may indicate and reinforce this by avoiding contact and engagement with the other party. People use deflection in a conversation in order to render a conversation pointless and insignificant. Tactics in stonewalling include giving sparse, vague responses; refusing to answer questions; and responding to questions with additional questions. Stonewalling can be used as a stalling tactic rather than an avoidance tactic. In the original definition by John Gottman, in interpersonal relationships, it is an involuntary physiological condition where one's nervous system shuts down in response to being flooded, and it is part of the pursuer-withdrawer, or criticism-stonewalling cycle.

== Politics ==
In politics, stonewalling is used to refuse to answer or comment on certain questions about policy and issues, especially when a committee or politician is under investigation. Stonewalling in politics and business can sometimes create a critical advantage. William Safire wrote that stonewalling was originally used to describe a defensive playstyle in Australian cricket, but its use during president Richard Nixon's Watergate affair brought it into usage in American politics as a "refusal to comment". Stonewalling can also be seen as filibustering, or stalling the passage of bills until they become outdated or changed when engaging in parliamentary procedures.

== Relationships ==
John Gottman talked about a negative feedback cycle in the fourth horseman in his Cascade Model of Relational Dissolution. In his studies, "stonewalling" is an involuntary nervous system shutdown response to being flooded, and most frequently happened to men, with women more frequently engaging in "criticism". Criticism and stonewalling are part of a cyclical pattern, also known as pursuer-withdrawer cycle, where one partner reaches out with complaints or criticism, and the other shuts down and withdraws, often triggering physiological flooding in the criticizing partner, which escalates their pursuit and can lead to harsher criticism in an attempt to get a reaction. Conversely, ongoing criticism also drives partners to stonewall as a defense mechanism against feeling overwhelmed. Gottman goes into detail on The Four Horsemen in his book, "The Seven Principles of Making a Marriage Work".

As the criticism/stonewalling cycle continues, it becomes the greatest predictor of divorce in a marriage, as the partners don't hear each other or listen to each other's disagreement, concern, side or argument, reduces their ability to engage and help address the situation, and there is no chance for resolution of conflict. When stonewalling occurs, it has both a physiological and psychological effect on the person who is stonewalling. Stonewalling is a physiological reaction, where the nervous system of the person who is stonewalling shuts down, because of a spike in heart rate and an increase in adrenaline and cortisol due to an increase in stress. It can be thought of as a fight or flight response causing the person to freeze. At another level, psychologically, stonewalling acts as a defense mechanism for preserving one's self and emotions. Other signs of stonewalling are silence, mumbling monotone utterances, changing the subject and physically removing oneself from the situation (e.g., leaving the room).

Alternatively, and with a view to recognizing agency, stonewalling in a personal relationship may be an intentional tool, as described herein above in the "Politics" section.

== Witnesses ==
Witnesses in court or other legal actions may refuse to cooperate with a counsel by withholding information and refusing to testify. Prosecutors may try to break their united front by offering incentives such as immunity from prosecution. Another tactic of stonewalling is to provide the jurors with misleading information or withhold possibly self-incriminating information. When witnesses use the stonewalling practice, they are usually in an agreement with other witnesses to do the same in order for the tactic to be effective.

== See also ==
- Cold shoulder
- Cry room
- Dumb insolence
- Filibuster
- Ghosting (behavior)
- Grey rock method
- Obstructionism
- Passive aggression
- Running out the clock
- Send to Coventry
- Silent treatment
- Social rejection
- Spiral of silence
