= Cascade Model of Relational Dissolution =

Relational communications theory

The Cascade Model of Relational Dissolution (also known as Gottman's Four Horsemen) is a relational communications theory that proposes four critically negative behaviors that lead to the breakdown of marital and romantic relationships. The model is the work of psychological researcher John Gottman, a professor at the University of Washington and founder of The Gottman Institute, and his research partner, Robert W. Levenson. This theory focuses on the negative influence of verbal and nonverbal communication habits on marriages and other relationships. Gottman's model uses a metaphor that compares the four negative communication styles that lead to a relationship's breakdown to the biblical Four Horsemen of the Apocalypse, wherein each behavior, or horseman, compounds the problems of the previous one, leading to total breakdown of communication.

== Background ==
Gottman's and Levenson's research focuses on differentiating failed and successful marriages and notes that nonverbal emotional displays progress in a linear pattern, creating an emotional and physical response that leads to withdrawal. Until the development of the model (1992-1994), little research had been conducted on specific interactive behaviors and processes that result in marital dissatisfaction, separation, and divorce. Gottman's and Levenson's research indicated that not all negative interactions, like anger, are predictive of relational separation and divorce. But it shows a strong correlation between the presence of contempt in a marriage and the couple's likelihood of divorce.

Gottman's and Levenson's research notes that the "cascade toward relational dissolution" can be predicted by the regulation of couples' positive and negative interactions, with couples that regulate their positive-to-negative interactions significantly less likely to experience the cascade. This research has been furthered by looking at ways to intervene in the cascade, and its application to other types and models of relationships.

== Four Horsemen of Relational Apocalypse ==
Gottman's and Levenson's Four Horsemen of the Apocalypse theory centers around the concept that the behaviors below work in a cascade model, in which one leads to the other, creating a continued environment of negativity and hostility. This creates marital dissatisfaction, leading to considerations of marital dissolution, separation, and permanent dissolution.

=== Horseman One: criticism ===
Criticism is the first indication of the Cascade Model and is an attack on the partner's character. Gottman defines criticism as a type of complaint that blames or attacks a partner's personality or character. Critical comments often materialize in chained comments and are communicated in broad, absolute statements like "‘you never’" or "you always."’ Research indicates that non-regulated couples, or couples whose interaction trended more negative, engaged more frequently in criticism and were more likely to begin the Cascade of Dissolution. Gottman's and Levenson's research found that wives' criticism correlated to separation and possible dissolution, but this was not so with husbands.

One possible solution to avoiding criticism is to grow the culture in a marriage to include a well-held vulnerability. This means that those in the marriage should feel safe enough to express their opinions and frustrations without fear of rejection. Criticism does not allow partners to be vulnerable with each other, and their relationship can quickly deteriorate as a result. One may consider using more "I" statements and expressive language in order to overcome criticism. An example of an "I" statement is: "When I am feeling frustrated, I tend to become more irritable and begin to hyper-focus on your flaws to blame someone for my negative feelings." "I" statements allow a spouse to take responsibility for their feelings rather than blaming the other spouse for their perspective and emotional reactions. They build emotional intelligence, self-reflection, and help prevent cycles of criticism and defensiveness.

=== Horseman Two: defensiveness ===
Defensiveness is a reaction to pervasive criticism that often results in responding to criticism with more criticism, and sometimes contempt, and the second level of the Cascade Model. Defensiveness is a protective behavior and is indicated by shifting blame and avoiding responsibility, often in an attempt to defend against the first two horsemen. Defensiveness stems from an internal response to protect one's pride and self-worth. The body may go into fight-or-flight mode to protect against a perceived threat in the defensive stage. Fowler and Dillow also characterize defensiveness as using counterattack behaviors such as whining, making negative assumptions about the other's feelings, and denials of responsibility. Gottman's and Levenson's research found defensiveness to be strongest among men.

=== Horseman Three: contempt ===
Contempt is the result of repetitive criticism and is driven by a lack of admiration and respect. It is the third level of the Cascade Model. Contempt is expressed verbally through mocking, sarcasm, and indignation, with an attempt to claim moral superiority over one's partner. It can also be indicated nonverbally, as with eye-rolling and scoffing. Gottman's and Levenson's research found contempt to be the strongest predictor of relational dissolution, and the strongest overall predictor for women.

=== Horseman Four: stonewalling ===
Stonewalling is the final phase of the model and is a reaction to the previous three behaviors. Stonewalling occurs when parties create mental and physical distance to avoid conflict by appearing busy, responding in grunts, and disengaging from the communication process. Gottman's and Levenson's research found it to be most common among men and a very challenging behavior to redirect once it becomes habitual.

== Gottman's research in predicting divorce ==
=== Predicting separation, and how divorce can be avoided ===
Gottman and his team did more extensive research in follow-up to this study, testing whether or not couples who exhibited these “horseman” were more or less likely to divorce. In a longitudinal study, Gottman and his team were able to predict with 93% accuracy how many couples would divorce from their observations.

They found that those couples who ended up separating had the following attributes in their marriage:

- Harsh Startup: In arguments or disagreements, those couples who participated in harsh startups were those who begin an argument with great aggression, refused to see another's point of view, or brought issues up at inappropriate times.
- The Four Horsemen: as above.
- Emotional Flooding: This condition occurs when one partner feels overwhelmed, and their brain begins to protect itself by shutting down. They physically and mentally cannot process any more what the other is saying. This may lead to the person who is not flooded to think the flooded person is not listening or does not care, when in fact, their system has been overwhelmed. This may occur when one partner brings up a controversial topic or points out many flaws in another in a short period of time.
- Body Language: Whether the couple is sending mixed messages, participating in a double-bind kind of thinking, or sending hostile nonverbal cues, destruction occurs.
- Repair Attempts that were not accepted: A repair attempt is anything that one partner tries to bring the relationship back into control. This could be de-escalation tactics, bringing up something about which you both stand on common ground about, or even an inside joke. These attempts, when accepted and acted upon, encourage intimacy and affection in a marriage and allow the situation to deescalate. Those who do not participate in this tactic will have a greater likelihood of an argument or fight escalating out of control.
- A Negative View on their marriage and their overall happiness together: Gottman found that those in the study who ended up divorcing or having low marital satisfaction thought about landmarks in their marriages as negative. The landmark moments that most people think of with fondness, such as their engagement, wedding, reception, birth of a child, etc., were almost all met with criticism from those in unhappy marriages. These people had trained their brain that their partner had never met their needs, and there had never been happiness in their relationship.
- Belligerence: Bad couples will sometimes try to provoke the other party with statements like "You think you're tough? Then do it!"

== Methodology and regulated vs. non-regulated couples ==
=== Behavioral coding systems methodology ===
Gottman and Levenson's primary research for this model, published in the 1990s, centered around utilizing a variety of measures, in combination, to study the conflict interactions amongst married couples. Gottman and Levenson physiological information garnered by polygraphs, EKGs, and pulse monitoring and behavioral information collected via survey and video recording. Information collected by video was coded using the Rapid Couples Interaction Scoring System (RCISS), the Special Affect Coding System (SPAFF), and the Marital Coding Information System (MCIS). RCISS consists of a thirteen-point speaker behavior and a nine-point listener checklist, which can be broken down into five positive and eight negative codes. The SPAFF is "a cultural informant coding system" which considers: verbal content, tone, and context; facial expression, movement, and gestures; and body movement. MCIS is the oldest and most widely used affect coding system, but is not as specific as others and is generally used in addition to other methods.

=== Regulated and nonregulated couples ===
Information obtained from the RCISS and SPAFF analysis lead to the formation of the idea of regulated and non-regulated couples. Gottman and Levenson defined nonregulated couples as more prone to conflict engaging behaviors, while regulated couples tend to engage in more constructive, positive communicative behaviors. It is noted that not all nonregulated couples exhibit all negative affective behaviors, nor do all regulated couples exhibit all positively affected behaviors. Gottman and Levenson proposed that maintaining marriage stability is not about the exclusion of negative behavior, but about maintaining a positive-to-negative comment ratio of around 5:1.

== The marital typology ==
Gottman's research indicates that there are five types of marriages: three of which are stable and avoid entering the Cascade Model, and two that are volatile. All of the three stable couple types achieve a similar balance between positive and negative affect; however, this does not mean that negative interactions or communication is eliminated.

=== Stable couple typologies ===
==== Validators ====
This couple mixes moderate amounts of positive and negative affect. This model is the preferred model of marital counselors and is a more intimate approach focused on shared experiences; however, romance may disappear over time. These couples engage in reduced persuasion attempts and do not attempt to persuade until a third of the conflict has elapsed.

==== Volatiles ====
This couple type mixes high amounts of positive and negative affect. These marriages tend to be quite "romantic and passionate, but [have] the risk of dissolving into endless bickering." These couples engage in high levels of persuasion from the beginning of a conflict.

==== Avoiders ====
This couple type mixes small amounts of positive and negative affect. This type of marriage avoids the pain associated with conflict, but risks loneliness and emotional distance. These couples make very few, if any, attempts to persuade each other.

=== Volatile couple typologies ===
==== Hostile ====
Hostile marriages often see the husband influence both positively and negatively, but the wife only influences by being positive. In general, "the wife is likely to seem quite aloof and detached to the husband, whereas he is likely to seem quite negative and excessively conflictual to her."

==== Hostile-detached ====
These relationships tend to display a significantly higher rate of contempt and defensiveness. Hostile-detached marriages see the husband influence both positively and negatively, but the wife only influences by being negative. In these cases, "the husband is likely to seem quite aloof and detached to the wife, whereas she is likely to seem quite negative and excessively conflictual to him."

=== Mismatch theory ===
This theory proposes that "hostile and hostile-detached couples simply fail to create a stable adaptation to marriage that is either volatile, validating, or avoiding." The belief is that marital instability arises from a couple's inability to accommodate one-another's preferences and create one of the three types of marriage.

== Interventions and therapeutic strategies ==
=== Proximal change interventions ===
Gottman and Tabres research on proximal change interventions attempts to interrupt the negative communications process by creating chances for positive influence to help alter relational dynamics and alter or repair damage done by the cascade. Two interventions were implemented, a "compliments intervention" and a "criticize intervention" design to increase positivity and negativity respectively. Groups were randomly assigned one of the two intervention conditions or a control group.

There was no main effect in affect from the pretest conflict discussion to the posttest conflict discussion between the interventions or control group. However, a manipulation check on how couples acted during either intervention produced a significant interaction effect.

The research indicated that couples determined the effectiveness of the interventions, as many non-regulated couples who have entered the Cascade Model will "construe" interventions by coding them into criticisms and/or by communicating with contempt. The effectiveness of these interventions is contingent on the continued facilitation and monitoring of interventions by therapists.

=== Avoidance and anxiety attachment ===
Researchers Fowler and Dillow note that avoidance attachment can be predictive of defensiveness and stonewalling whereby an individual is reluctant to depend on others. Those with avoidance attachment may also struggle to regulate negative emotions and be prone to lashing out at partners. Fowler and Dillow hypothesized that avoidance attachment can be predictive through self-reports of criticism, contempt and defensiveness; however, research finding indicated that avoidance attachment was only predictive of stonewalling.

Fowler and Dillow noted that anxiety attachment, characterized by over-dependence, flooding, and fear of rejection, will also predict criticism, contempt, and defensiveness as those who exhibit anxiety attachment tend to become self-fulfilling prophecies.

=== Flooding ===
Flooding occurs when strong negative emotions are present within exchanges between individuals. It causes individuals to feel overwhelmed and can lead to destructive communication such as name calling and criticism. Oftentimes, individuals express that their partner's negative emotions come out of nowhere and therefore they will do what they feel is necessary to retreat from the negativity.

Individuals may begin to adopt behaviors that discourage effective communication such as becoming defensive and generating negative qualities for their partner's behavior. Further, marital satisfaction has been shown to decrease over time as couples are more aroused during conflict. This in turn causes a destructive loop of higher frequencies of flooding as well as an increase in self-isolation and destructive communication patterns.

To combat flooding, couples could try to take breaks during conflict. Doing this has proved to reduce heart rates, which in turn, reduces negative behaviors. Another way to reduce flooding is to resolve conflicts through text-based or voice communication instead of face to face. This may allow individuals to regulate their emotions with more control.

=== Gottman method couples therapy ===
Research into Gottman method couples therapy has been of poor quality and is insufficient to consider the therapy as evidence-based, despite its popularity.

== Criticisms ==
Gottman has been criticized for claiming that his Cascade Model can predict divorce with over a 90% accuracy. Additionally, researcher Stanley Scott and his colleagues noted that Gottman's highly publicized research findings from 1998, which recommended significant shifts in focus and application for marital educators and therapists, including the de-emphasis of anger management and active listening, has several flaws. Among the concerns raised, the most significant are methodological, including Gottman and his fellow researchers not providing justification for the nonrandom selection of participants, not controlling for cultural impacts, and flaws in physiological impact analysis. Concerns were also raised about the methods for observational data collection and the ambiguity of statistics tests used. Stanley's findings indicate that, while Gottman's findings are interesting, there are too many unexplained methods and that additional research is needed before the overhauling Gottman's suggested.
