= Logan Ury =

American psychologist, author

Logan Ury (born 1987 or 1988) is an American behavior expert, author, and dating coach who may be best known for her book How to Not Die Alone (Simon & Schuster, 2021).

== Biography ==
=== Early life ===
Logan Ury was raised in Boca Raton, Florida. She graduated from Spanish River Community High School and competed in Original Oratory on the speech and debate team. She has a Bachelor’s degree in psychology from Harvard University.

=== Career ===
Ury worked at Google as the co-head of the behavioral economics lab. She was a 2018 TED resident.

She published her first book, How to Not Die Alone (Simon & Schuster), in 2021.

Ury is the director of relationship science at Hinge, a dating app.

She has written for The Gottman Institute and Men's Health. She provides dating coaching on the podcast This Is Dating. Ury has appeared on All Things Considered and Millennial Love Podcast. She is also the dating coach for the single participants on the 2024 Netflix docuseries The Later Daters.

=== Personal life ===
Ury married a former Harvard classmate, Scott, in June 2020. She lives in the San Francisco Bay area. Ury is Jewish.

== Works ==
- How to Not Die Alone. Simon & Schuster, 2021.
