= Blank expression =

Neutral positioning of the facial features

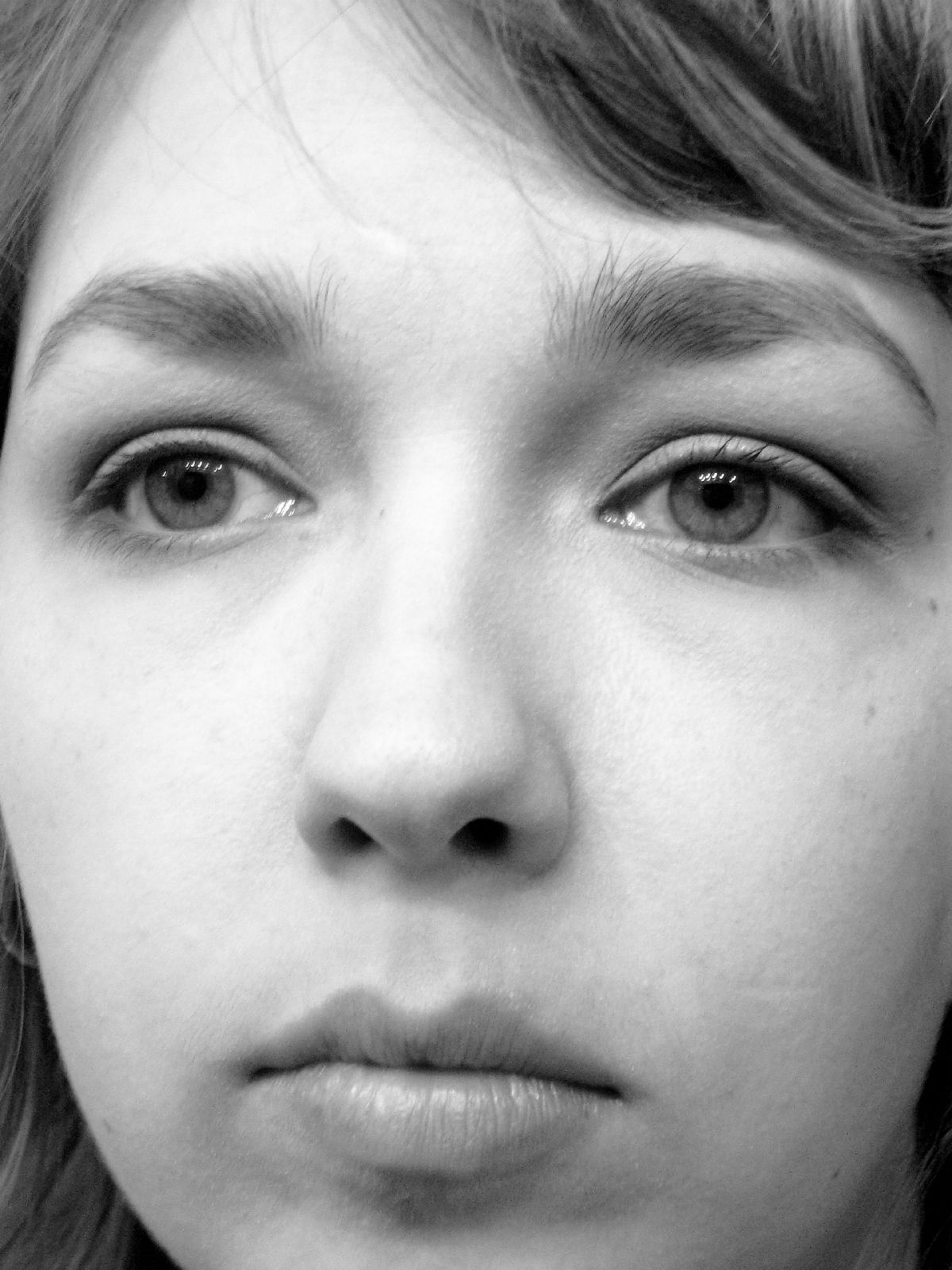
A woman with a neutral expression

A blank expression, also known as a poker face, is a facial expression characterized by neutral positioning of the facial features, implying a lack of strong emotion. It may be caused by emotionlessness, depression, boredom or slight confusion, such as when a listener does not understand what has been said.

Another possible cause for a blank expression is traumatic brain injury such as a concussion. If someone has just been hit on the head and retains a blank or dazed expression, this can warn of concussions early.

Psychiatric disorders such as schizophrenia, facial paralysis, post-traumatic stress disorder, and autism, may also cause a blank expression.

== Poker face ==
The term "poker face" is described as a deliberately induced blank expression meant to conceal one's emotions, referring to the common practice of maintaining one's composure when playing the card game poker. This term comes from the special language used in poker, and is not only about a person's facial expression but also other extraneous movements that could give insight into what they are feeling, such as clenching fists, bouncing a leg, or constant repositioning of their body and or cards.

The first recorded publication of the term "poker face" is from the 1875 book Round Games at Cards by Cavendish (a pseudonym for Henry Jones), which reads "It follows that the possession of a good poker face is an advantage. No one who has any pretensions to good play will betray the value of his hand by gesture, change of countenance, or any other symptom."

The term "poker face" was used outside the game of poker by American sportswriters in the 1920s to describe a competitor who appeared unaffected by stressful situations (an important skill when playing poker for money, to avoid giving an opponent any tells about one's hand). It is similarly used with reference to marketers and salespeople during business negotiations.

== See also ==
- Catatonia
- Deadpan
- Highway hypnosis
- Reduced affect display
- Resting bitch face
- Thousand-yard stare
