= Resting bitch face =

Internet meme for a facial expression

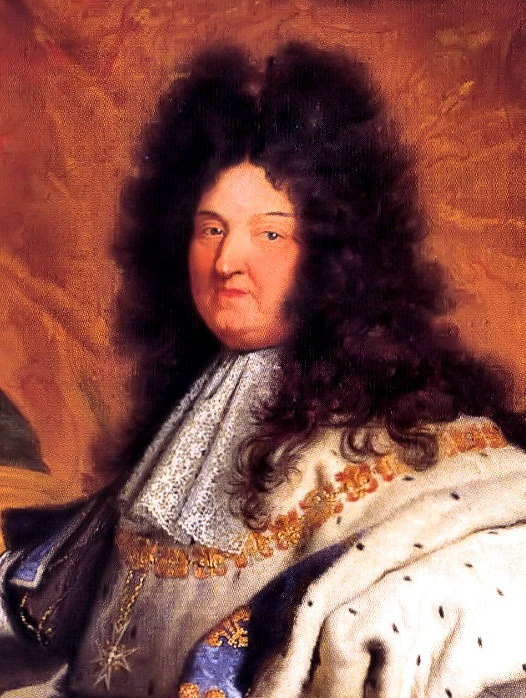
Louis XIV, King of France, depicted by Hyacinthe Rigaud with his face resting

Resting bitch face (RBF) is a facial expression that unintentionally creates the impression a person is angry, annoyed, irritated, or contemptuous, particularly when the individual is relaxed or resting. This can lead to people thinking the person may not care about a topic or may lack respect for the person talking at the moment. The concept has been studied by psychologists and may have psychological implications related to facial biases, gender stereotypes, human judgement, and decision-making.

== History ==
In a 2013 year-end round-up of newly popular words and phrases, The New York Times writer Grant Barrett asserted that the phrase dates back "at least ten years". In December 2012, a joke by Clare O'Kane about being harassed for having RBF, "I look bitchy and sleepy," was spotlighted in a SFGate.com review of a San Francisco sketch show.

On September 12, 2011, the Groundlings featured a sketch titled "Resting Bitch Face" (written by Patric Cagle, co-starring Nate Clark, and directed by Mitch Silpa). The sketch was uploaded to YouTube on October 11 and performed repeatedly during autumn of the same year.

On May 22, 2013, the comedy group Broken People uploaded a parody public service announcement video titled "Bitchy Resting Face" (BRF) on the Funny or Die website in which male and female "sufferers" of an annoyed-looking blank expression ask for understanding from non-sufferers. The video features comedian Milana Vayntrub.

The facial expression has gone on to become a popular Internet meme identified by the acronym RBF.

== Spread in wider culture ==
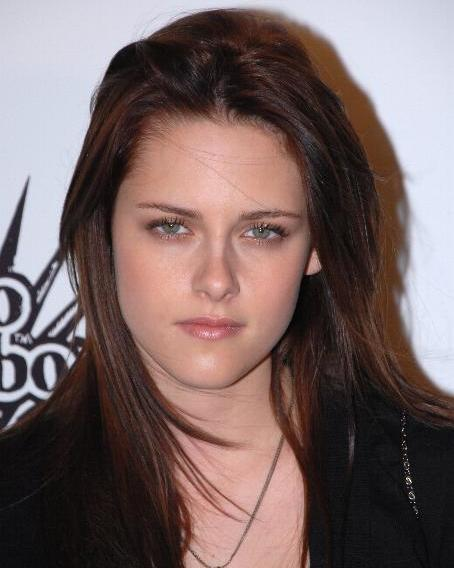
Actress Kristen Stewart's face has often been described as a "resting bitch face", which she has acknowledged.

The term has become widely referred to in the media. It has made its way into lifestyle and fashion magazines for women such as Cosmopolitan and Elle, and been mentioned in published literature, both fiction and non-fiction.

Hadley Freeman wrote that since it appeared in the Broken People video, it had enjoyed a stratospheric rise, and pointed out that the male equivalent term "resting asshole face" (RAF) highlighted in that video had not received the same degree of comment. New York University psychologist Jonathan Freeman carried out a study showing that slightly angry facial expressions makes other people think someone is untrustworthy.

In a 2014 article in the journal Philological Quarterly, paper author Chloé Hogg asserted that the phenomenon was not new, and offered Hyacinthe Rigaud's portrait of Louis XIV of France depicting his "bitchy resting face". Degrees of resting bitch face can vary greatly.

In 2015, CBS News reported that some plastic surgeons were using plastic surgery to help patients with RBF.

In October 2015, scientists from the company Noldus Information Technology used their FaceReader software to analyze the faces of celebrities like Kanye West, Kristen Stewart, Anna Kendrick, and Queen Elizabeth II, notable public figures who have been known to occasionally wear a less-than-pleased expression.

== See also ==
- Facial feedback hypothesis
- Gen Z stare
- Grumpy Cat
- Social identity theory
