= Grey rock method =

Communication disengagement method

The grey rock method, colloquially called grey rocking, is a communication pattern to deliberately act unresponsive and uninterested to encourage disengagement with difficult people. By adopting the dull qualities of a grey rock, the technique of grey rocking negates the emotional reaction people try to elicit.

The term was coined in 2012 by an American mental-health blogger using the pseudonym Skylar.

No clinical studies have been conducted on the effectiveness of the grey rock method, but anecdotal evidence has suggested that it is effective on individuals with narcissistic personality disorder and in situations of emotional abuse.
