= Emotional flooding =

Form of psychotherapy

Emotional flooding is a form of psychotherapy that involves attacking the unconscious and/or subconscious mind to release repressed feelings and fears. Many of the techniques used in modern emotional flooding practice have roots in history, some tracing as far back as early tribal societies. For more information on emotional flooding, see Flooding (psychology).

== Tribal societies ==
Tribal communities often have a shaman, or a medicine man, whose primary responsibilities include diagnosing illnesses, prescribing herbs and suggesting other treatments to cure the afflicted of their ailments. Many ritual cures include free displays of emotion.

In his book, The Discovery of the Unconscious, Henri Ellenberger claims that shamans historically were primarily practitioners of psychosomatic medicine. These shamans did not consider the possibility of a split between mind and body, unlike the popular beliefs of the Western philosophical movement. Dr. Paul Olsen said, "Implicit in the belief that any sort of illness contains emotional elements is an unverbalized acknowledgment of an unconscious process. It follows that liberation of these elements is a pathway to cure. In essence, the shamans were dealing with a crude but strikingly accurate concept of repression."

The link between these methods and modern techniques is the emphasis upon working with the body. Psychiatrist Ari Kiev said, "[groups that] facilitate change by producing excessive cortical excitation, emotional exhaustion, and states of reduced resistance or hypersuggestibility, which in turn increases the patient's chances of being converted to new points of view [are consistent with modern-day modalities of primal therapy and encounter.]"

According to some researchers, many tribal afflictions were more likely symptoms of disorders such as depression or schizophrenia. Similar to the treatments for these disorders practiced today, historically the treatments shamans practiced often required the patient to recall difficult experiences and to recreate a wide range of emotional accounts.

== Early Renaissance ==
Doctors from the Renaissance period also practiced treatments that resembled emotional flooding for patients afflicted with demonic possession. Paul Olsen says, "Possession was truly a diagnostic category of its day, encompassing practically any form of religi-culturally determined psychopathology.”

Practitioners frequently attributed many ailments, as well as most odd behaviors, now recognized as mental diseases to Satan and other demons. This was particularly true when the ravings, actions, or hallucinatory experiences could be considered blasphemous or heretical.

Cures for possession by the devil focused on spiritual salvation and were aimed at getting to a person's unconscious and unacceptable impulses and wishes. Many people who confessed under the duress of torture may well have been releasing repressed material. In all likelihood, pain stimulated a flood of unconscious crimes, such as murderous rage against authority figures, incest wishes, or any number of socially determined offenses.

Exorcism rituals aimed at rescuing the soul from Satan. The effects of the procedure may have also relieved some of the body's anguish through release of emotional pain. These techniques resembled modern emotional flooding techniques. The emphasis on emotion was strong in exorcism techniques; the exorcist tried to temper its expression or to liberate it.

== Nineteenth century ==
=== Pierre Janet and hypnosis ===
Pierre Janet was a French hypnotist who used hypnosis to study the dissociative tendencies of the mind. Researcher John Ryan Haule studied Janet's work and observed that Janet referred to the hypnotic process as 'influence somnambulique.' Before 1900, Janet saw somnambulism as the essential condition, of which hysteria, hypnosis, multiple personality, and spiritualism were variations. Janet used the word somnambulism to refer to any kind of activity pursued while in a dissociated condition, not just to sleepwalking. Janet used hypnosis to manipulate the somnambulistic condition. He identified three phases.

1. Fatigue: The treated patient feels exhausted upon awaking from the hypnotic trance.

2. Health: When the fatigue is gone, the patient seems to be in perfect health. All symptoms of the disorder are gone, and the patient appears to be "back to normal." However, the patient is not cured and this phase is temporary. The only sign that something is odd is the patient's obsession with the hypnotist.

3. Obsession: Following the brief phase of apparent good health, all symptoms return. The patient has a strong desire to be put to sleep, almost like withdrawal symptoms, and wants to undergo hypnosis again. The patient also has a strange, almost sexual, obsession with the hypnotist.

Janet was not only a hypnotist. He would engage the patient, talk to him, address the "sick" forces within him, and attempt to use hypnosis to contact the unconscious. Like exorcism, hypnosis also attacked the unconscious.

Experts now refer to Janet's approach as the cathartic method. In A Critical Dictionary of Psychoanalysis, Charles Rycroft said that abreaction was the term applied to the expression of affect, with the subsequent alleviation of symptoms being the catharsis.

Later, Sigmund Freud and his followers deemed the cathartic cure to be unsuccessful because it did not stimulate awareness of unconscious factors and did not result in insight, which meant that there may be symptom substitution which could lead to no real cure.

=== Wilhelm Reich and the therapeutic approach ===
Over time, psychiatrists abandoned hypnosis and the cathartic cure and adopted the therapeutic approach as the accepted practice. The therapeutic approach emphasized the expression of emotion, as a by-product of the goal to make the unconscious conscious. rather than as the main event.

Wilhelm Reich was an Austrian-American psychiatrist who worked with Sigmund Freud. Reich focused on the body, trying to make body-mind duality a seamless concept. He believed that the body was the unconscious and that the psychologist must break through the body's armor to reach the subconscious. He called the body's defenses armoring.

W. Edward Mann called attention to the body's visible displays of character armor such as muscular tension and stated that armoring was the character structure in its physical form. He explained that if one could break down the armoring one would be able to change the neurotic character structure.

Researchers now understand these displays as physical defenses; the body reacts in certain ways to defend the person against the expression of undesirable emotion. Mann explains the build-up of armoring as the body's physical response to create blocks for natural biological movements such as curiosity, play, sex, exploration, or defiance of authority. Reich's writings imply that there are no benefits in armoring, a belief that most modern-day experts do not accept.

Essentially, the technique meant that to properly treat the problem, the therapist must break down the body's defenses to allow repressed emotion to come out.

== Contemporary practice ==
Modern uses of emotional flooding include:

- Gestalt therapy, developed by Frederick S. Perls
- Immersion therapy
- Sensory hypnoanalysis, used by Milton Kline
