= Millennial economics =

Millennials, also known as Generation Y, are the demographic cohort following Generation X and preceding Generation Z. The generation is typically defined as people born from 1981 to 1996.

Using a variety of measures, economists have reached the conclusion that the rate of innovation and entrepreneurship has been declining across the Western world between the early 1990s and early 2010s, when it leveled off. In the case of the U.S., one of the most complex economies in existence, economist Nicholas Kozeniauskas explained that "the decline in entrepreneurship is concentrated among the smart" as the share of entrepreneurs with university degrees in that country more than halved between the mid-1980s and the mid-2010s. There are many possible reasons for this: population aging, market concentration, and zombie firms (those with low productivity but are kept alive by subsidies). While employment has become more stable and more suitable, modern economies are so complex they are essentially ossified, making them vulnerable to disruptions.

== In Asia ==
Statistics from the International Monetary Fund (IMF) reveal that between 2014 and 2019, Japan's unemployment rate went from about 4% to 2.4% and China's from almost 4.5% to 3.8%. These are some of the lowest rates among the largest economies of the world. However, due to long-running sub-replacement fertility, Japan had just over two workers per retiree in the 2010s, compared to four in North America. As a result, the country faces economic stagnation and serious financial burden to support the elderly. China's economy was growing at a feverish pace between the late 1970s till the early 2010s, when demographic constraints made themselves felt. Key to China's "economic miracle" was its one-child policy, which curbed population growth and enabled the economy to industrialize rapidly. Yet the policy has also led to population aging. Political economist and demographer Nicholas Eberstadt argued that China's working population peaked in 2014. Even so, economist Brad Setser suggested that China can still increase its GDP per capita by raising the age of retirement and making it easier for people to migrate from rural to urban areas. But social scientist Wang Feng warned that as the population ages, social welfare spending as a share of GDP will also grow, intensifying sociopolitical problems. During the mid-2010s, China had five workers for every retiree. But if current trends continue, by the 2040s, that ratio will fall to just 1.6.

At the start of the twenty-first century, export-oriented South Korea and Taiwan were young and dynamic compared to Japan, but they, too, were ageing quickly. Their millennial cohorts are too small compared to the baby boomers. The fact that large numbers of South Koreans and Taiwanese were entering retirement will restrict the ability of their countries to save and invest.

According to IMF, "Vietnam is at risk of growing old before it grows rich." The share of working-age Vietnamese peaked in 2011, when the country's annual GDP per capita at purchasing power parity was $5,024, compared to $32,585 for South Korea, $31,718 for Japan, and $9,526 for China. Many Vietnamese youths suffer from unstable job markets, low wages, and high costs of living in the cities. As a result, large numbers live with their parents till the age of 30. These are some of the reasons contributing to Vietnam's falling fertility rate and population aging.

== In Europe ==
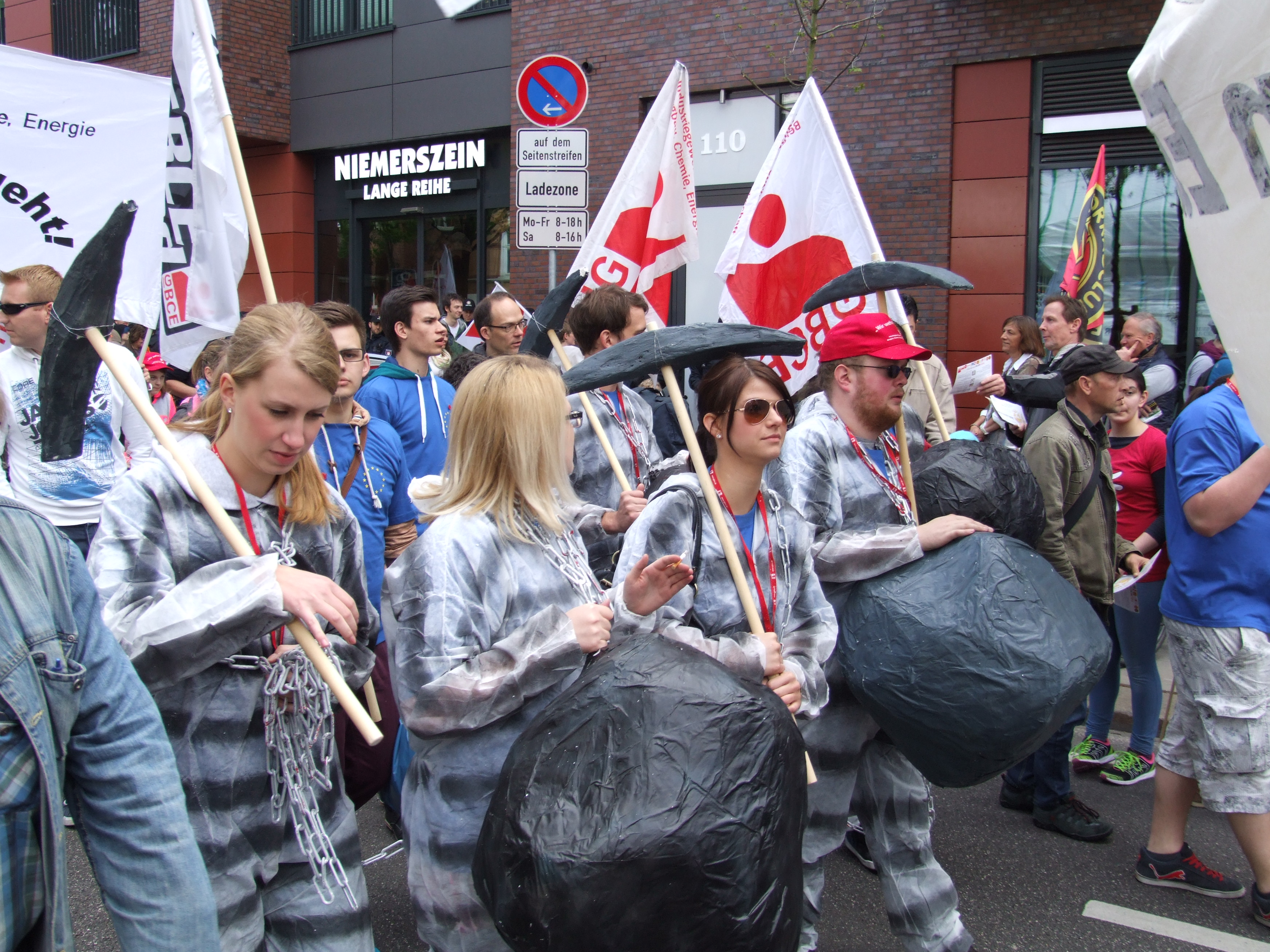
Young Germans protesting youth unemployment at a 2014 event

Economic prospects for some millennials have declined largely due to the Great Recession in the late 2000s. Several governments have instituted major youth employment schemes out of fear of social unrest due to the dramatically increased rates of youth unemployment. In Europe, youth unemployment levels were very high (56% in Spain, 44% in Italy, 35% in the Baltic states, 19% in Britain and more than 20% in many more countries). In 2009, leading commentators began to worry about the long-term social and economic effects of the unemployment.

A variety of names have emerged in various European countries hard hit following the 2008 financial crisis to designate young people with limited employment and career prospects. These groups can be considered to be more or less synonymous with millennials, or at least major sub-groups in those countries. The Generation of €700 is a term popularized by the Greek mass media and refers to educated Greek twixters of urban centers who generally fail to establish a career. In Greece, young adults are being "excluded from the labor market" and some "leave their country of origin to look for better options". They are being "marginalized and face uncertain working conditions" in jobs that are unrelated to their educational background, and receive the minimum allowable base salary of €700 per month. This generation evolved in circumstances leading to the Greek debt crisis and some participated in the 2010–2011 Greek protests. In Spain, they are referred to as the mileurista (for €1,000 per month), in France "The Precarious Generation," and as in Spain, Italy also has the "milleurista"; generation of €1,000 (per month).

Between 2009 and 2018, about half a million Greek youths left their country in search of opportunities elsewhere, and this phenomenon has exacerbated the nation's demographic problem. Such brain drains are rare among countries with good education systems. Greek millennials benefit from tuition-free universities but suffer from their government's mishandling of taxes and excessive borrowing. Greek youths typically look for a career in finance in the United Kingdom, medicine in Germany, engineering in the Middle East, and information technology in the United States. Many also seek advanced degrees abroad in order to ease the visa application process.

In 2016, research from the Resolution Foundation found millennials in the United Kingdom earned £8,000 less in their 20s than Generation X, describing millennials as "on course to become the first generation to earn less than the one before". According to a report from the same organization in 2017, the rate of home ownership of British baby boomers was 75% and "the real value of estates passing on death has more than doubled over the past 20 years." For this reason, the transfer of wealth between the baby boomers and their children, the millennials, will prove highly beneficial to the latter compared to previous cohorts, especially those who came from high-income families.

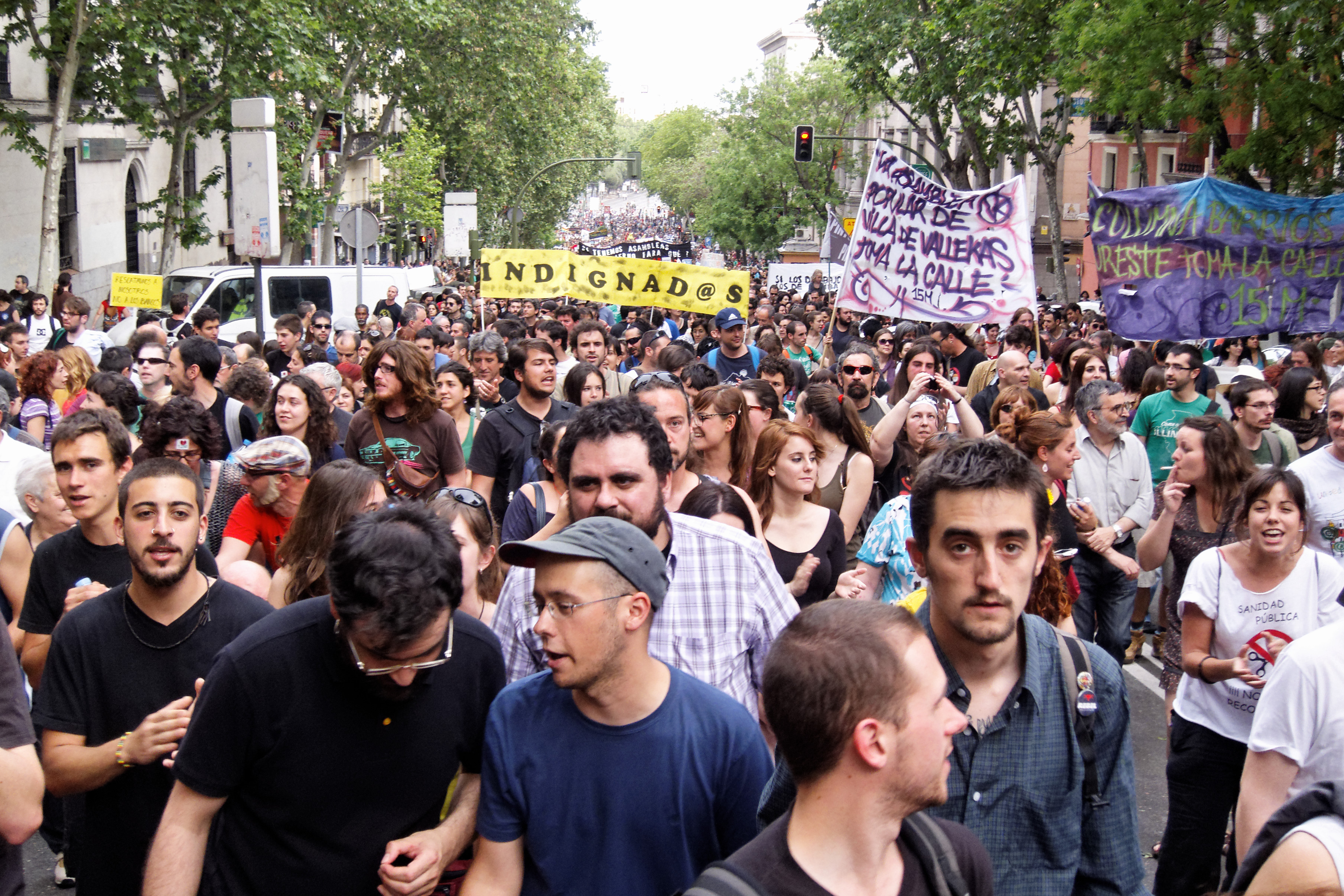
The anti-austerity movement in Spain

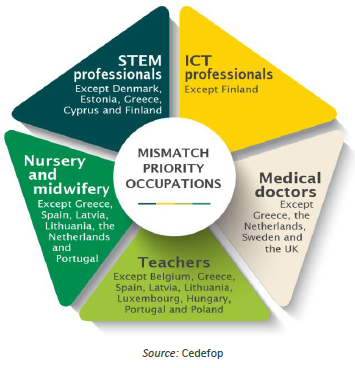
Top five high-skilled professions with insufficient workers in the European Union in the late 2010s

Spanish think-tank Fedea noted that there were way too few young Europeans enrolled in vocational programs that teach them skills favored by the job market. Many new entrants to the workforce lacked the necessary skills demanded by employers.

Since joining the European Union during the 2007 enlargement of the European Union, Bulgaria has seen a significant portion of its population, many of whom young and educated, leave for better opportunities elsewhere, notably Germany. While the government has failed to keep reliable statistics, economists have estimated that at least 60,000 Bulgarians leave their homeland each year. 30,000 moved to Germany in 2017. As of 2019, an estimated 1.1 million Bulgarians lived abroad. Bulgaria had a population of about seven million in 2018, and this number is projected to continue to decline not just due to low birth rates but also to emigration.

Due to the strong correlation between economic growth and youth employment, recessions come with dire consequences for young people in the workforce. In the struggling Southern European economies, such as Greece and Spain, youth unemployment lingered on in the aftermath of the Great Recession, remaining stuck at around a third. With another recession induced by the COVID-19 global pandemic, it could rise to about half. Even the Czech Republic, which previously boasted the lowest youth unemployment rate in Europe, at about 5%, could see that number triple in 2020. Overall, European job markets are hostile towards new entrants, who, unlike their older counterparts, do not have permanent contracts and are often the first to be laid off during hard times.

== In Canada ==
In Canada, the youth unemployment rate in July 2009 was 16%, the highest in 11 years. Between 2014 and 2019, Canada's overall unemployment rate fell from about 7% to below 6%. However, a 2018 survey by accounting and advisory firm BDO Canada found that 34% of millennials felt "overwhelmed" by their non-mortgage debt. For comparison, this number was 26% for Generation X and 13% for the Baby Boomers. Canada's average non-mortgage debt was CAN$20,000 in 2018. About one in five millennials were delaying having children because of financial worries. Many Canadian millennial couples are also struggling with their student loan debts.

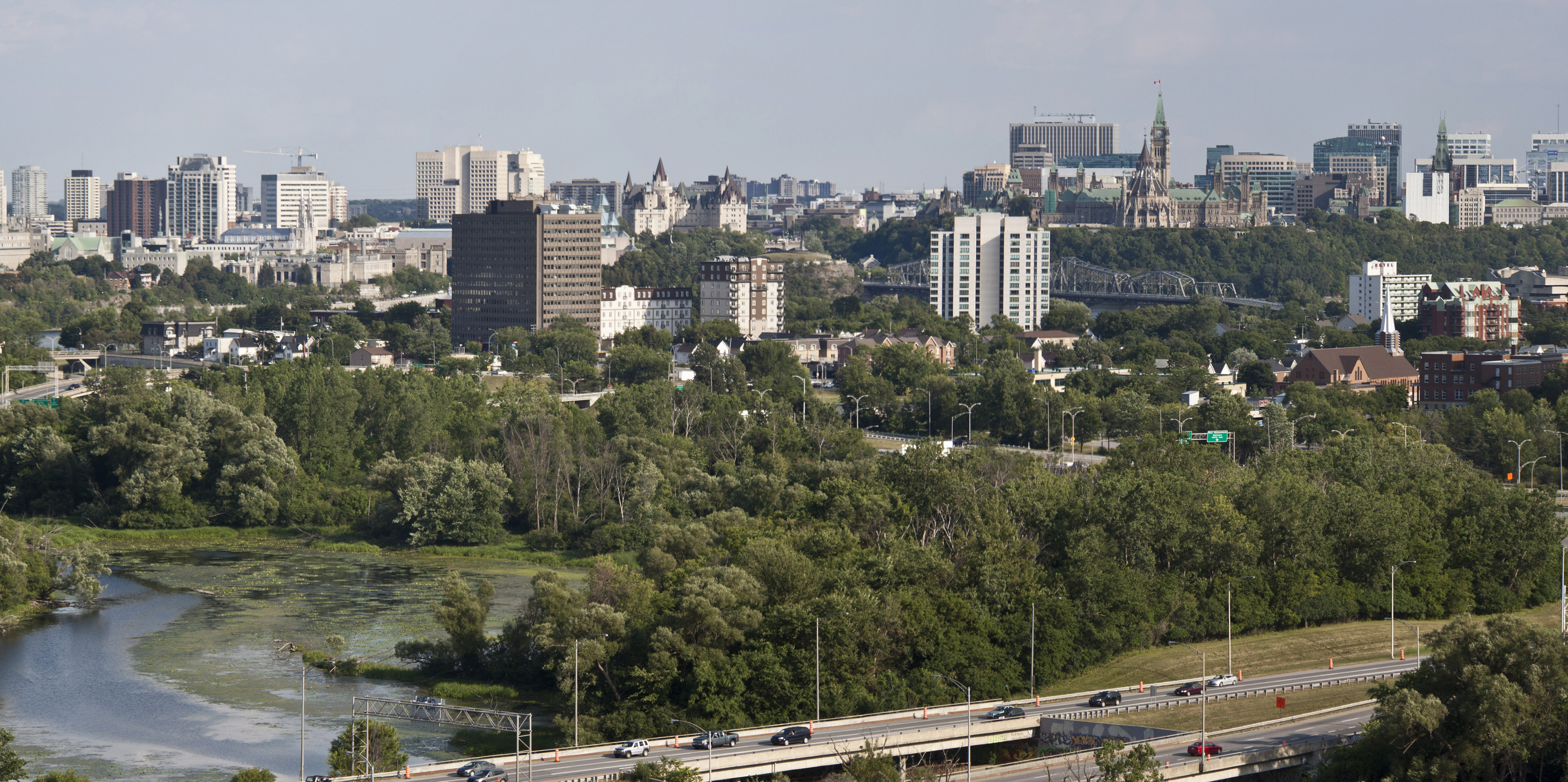
Ottawa became a magnet for millennials in the late 2010s.

Despite expensive housing costs, Canada's largest cities, Vancouver, Toronto, and Montreal, continue to attract millennials thanks to their economic opportunities and cultural amenities. Research by the Royal Bank of Canada (RBC) revealed that for every person in the 20-34 age group who leaves the nation's top cities, Toronto gains seven while Vancouver and Montreal gain up to a dozen each. In fact, there has been a surge in the millennial populations of Canada's top three cities between 2015 and 2018. However, millennials' rate of home ownership will likely drop as increasing numbers choose to rent instead. By 2019, however, Ottawa emerged as a magnet for millennials with its strong labor market and comparatively low cost of living, according to a study by Ryerson University. Many of the millennials relocating to the nation's capital were above the age of 25, meaning they were more likely to be job seekers and home buyers rather than students.

An average Canadian home was worth C$484,500 in 2018. Despite government legislation (mortgage stress test rules), such a price was quite high compared to some decades before. Adjusted for inflation, it was C$210,000 in 1976. Paul Kershaw of the University of British Columbia calculated that the average amount of extra money needed for a down payment in the late 2010s compared to one generation before was equivalent to eating 17 avocado toasts each day for ten years. Meanwhile, the option of renting in a large city is increasingly out of reach for many young Canadians. In 2019, the average rent in Canada cost C$1,040 a month, according to the Canada Mortgage and Housing Corporation (CMHC). But, as is always the case in real-estate, location matters. An average two-bedroom apartment cost C$1,748 per month in Vancouver and C$1,547 per month in Toronto, with vacancy rates at about 1.1% and 1.5%, respectively. Canada's national vacancy rate was 2.4% in 2018, the lowest since 2009. New supply—rental apartment complexes that are newly completed or under construction—has not been able to keep up with rising demand. Besides higher prices, higher interest rates and stricter mortgage rules have made home ownership more difficult. International migration contributes to rising demand for housing, especially rental apartments, according to the CMHC, as new arrivals tend to rent rather than purchase. Moreover, a slight decline in youth unemployment in 2018 also drove up demand. While the Canadian housing market is growing, this growth is detrimental to the financial well-being of young Canadians.

In 2019, Canada's net public debt was C$768 billion. Meanwhile, U.S. public debt amounted to US$22 trillion. The Canadian federal government's official figure for the debt-to-GDP ratio was 31%. However, this figure left out debts from lower levels of government. Once these were taken into account, the figure jumped to 88%, according to the International Monetary Fund. For comparison, that number was 238% for Japan, 107% for the United States, and 99% for France. Canada's public debt per person was over CAN$18,000. For Americans, it was US$69,000. Since the Great Recession, Canadian households have accumulated significantly more debt. According to Statistics Canada, the national debt-to-disposable income ratio was 175% in 2019. It was 105% in the U.S. Meanwhile, the national median mortgage debt rose from C$95,400 in 1999 to C$190,000 in 2016 (in 2016 dollars). Numbers are much higher in the Greater Toronto Area, Vancouver, and Victoria, B.C.

A 2018 survey by Abacus Data of 4,000 Canadian millennials found that 80% identified as members of the middle class, 55% had pharmaceutical insurance, 53% dental insurance, 36% a Registered Retirement Savings Plan (RRSP), and 29% an employer-sponsored pension plan. A number of millennials have opted to save their money and retire early while traveling rather than settling in an expensive North American city. According to them, such a lifestyle costs less than living in a large city.

Between the late-2000s and mid-2010s, Canada's tourism deficit—the difference in the amount Canadian travelers spent inside versus outside the nation—grew considerably, exceeding CAN$10 billion in 2008. According to Destination Canada, a Crown agency responsible for promoting tourism in Canada, younger Canadians were eight times more likely to travel outside Canada than inside the nation. This is due to a number of factors. The cost of transportation within Canada was often higher than that of traveling to other countries. For example, flight tickets to Europe were often cheaper than to Toronto or Montreal. Many Canadian millennials view foreign destinations as exotic and more desirable than in Canada. Social media influenced this tendency, as posts showcasing non-Canadian sites were better received than those about Canadian destinations.

== In the United States ==
=== Employment and finances ===
Though baby boomers have accumulated more wealth than later generations, Millennials and Generation X are accumulating wealth at comparable rates to baby boomers.

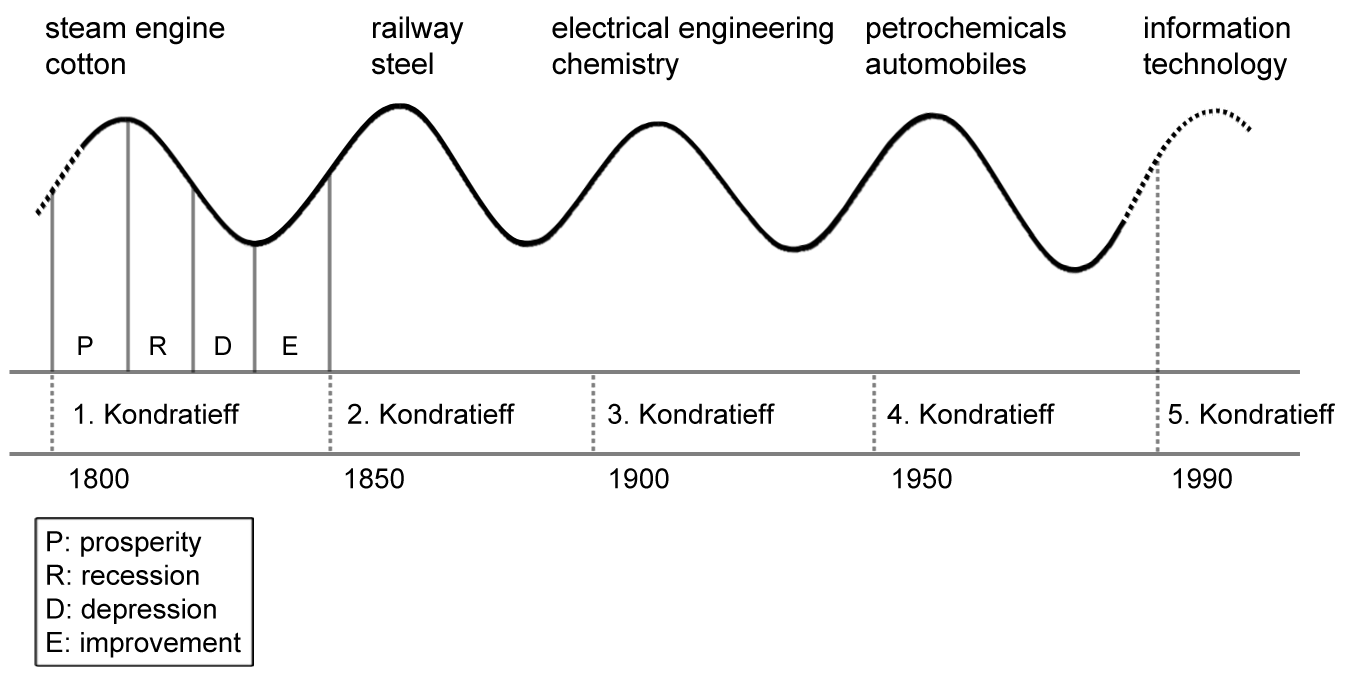
The Kondratiev cycle

Quantitative historian Peter Turchin observed that demand for labor in the United States had been stagnant since 2000 and would likely continue to 2020 as the nation approached the trough of the Kondratiev wave. (See graphic.) Moreover, the share of people in their 20s continued to grow till the end of the 2010s according projections by the U.S. Census Bureau, meaning the youth bulge would likely not fade away before the 2020s. As such the gap between the supply and demand in the labor market would likely not fall before then, and falling or stagnant wages generate sociopolitical stress. For example, between the mid-1970s and 2011, the number of law-school graduates tripled, from around 400,000 to 1.2 million while the population grew by only 45%. During the 2010s, U.S. law schools produced 25,000 surplus graduates each year, and many of them were in debt. The number of people with a Master's of Business Administration (MBA) degree grew even faster. Having more highly educated people than the market can absorb—elite overproduction—can destabilize society.

The youth unemployment rate in the U.S. reached a record 19% in July 2010 since the statistic started being gathered in 1948. Underemployment is also a major factor. In the U.S. the economic difficulties have led to dramatic increases in youth poverty, unemployment, and the numbers of young people living with their parents. In April 2012, it was reported that half of all new college graduates in the US were still either unemployed or underemployed.

In fact, millennials have benefited the least from the economic recovery following the Great Recession, as average incomes for this generation have fallen at twice the general adult population's total drop and are likely to be on a path toward lower incomes for at least another decade. According to a Bloomberg L.P., "Three and a half years after the worst recession since the Great Depression, the earnings and employment gap between those in the under-35 population and their parents and grandparents threatens to unravel the American dream of each generation doing better than the last. The nation's younger workers have benefited least from an economic recovery that has been the most uneven in recent history." Despite higher college attendance rates than Generation X, many were stuck in low-paid jobs, with the percentage of degree-educated young adults working in low-wage industries rising from 23% to 33% between 2000 and 2014. Not only did they receive lower wages, they also had to work longer hours for fewer benefits. By the mid-2010s, it had already become clear that the U.S. economy was evolving into a highly dynamic and increasingly service-oriented system, with careers getting replaced by short-term full-time jobs, full-time jobs by part-time positions, and part-time positions by income-generating hobbies. In one important way the economic prospects of millennials are similar to those of their parents the baby boomers: their huge number means that the competition for jobs was always going to be intense.

A 2013 joint study by sociologists at the University of Virginia and Harvard University found that the decline and disappearance of stable full-time jobs with health insurance and pensions for people who lack a college degree has had profound effects on working-class Americans, who now are less likely to marry and have children within marriage than those with college degrees. Data from a 2014 study of U.S. millennials revealed over 56% of this cohort considers themselves as part of the working class, with only approximately 35% considering themselves as part of the middle class; this class identity is the lowest polling of any generation. A 2020 paper by economists William G. Gale, Hilary Gelfond, Jason J. Fichtner, and Benjamin H. Harris examines the wealth accumulated by different demographic cohorts using data from the Survey of Consumer Finances. They find that while the Great Recession has diminished the wealth of all age groups in the short run, a longitudinal analysis reveals that older generations have been able to acquire more wealth whereas millennials have gotten poorer overall. In particular, the wealth of millennials in 2016 was less than that of older generations when they were their age in 1989 and 2007. Millennials enjoy a number of important advantages compared to their elders, such as higher levels of education, and longer working lives, but they suffer some disadvantages including limited prospects of economic growth, leading to delayed home ownership and marriage.

Millennials are the most highly educated and culturally diverse group of all generations, and have been regarded as hard to please when it comes to employers. To address these new challenges, many large firms are currently studying the social and behavioral patterns of millennials and are trying to devise programs that decrease intergenerational estrangement, and increase relationships of reciprocal understanding between older employees and millennials. The UK's Institute of Leadership & Management researched the gap in understanding between millennial recruits and their managers in collaboration with Ashridge Business School. The findings included high expectations for advancement, salary and for a coaching relationship with their manager, and suggested that organizations will need to adapt to accommodate and make the best use of millennials. In an example of a company trying to do just this, Goldman Sachs conducted training programs that used actors to portray millennials who assertively sought more feedback, responsibility, and involvement in decision making. After the performance, employees discussed and debated the generational differences which they saw played out. In 2014, millennials were entering an increasingly multi-generational workplace. Even though research has shown that millennials are joining the workforce during a tough economic time, they still have remained optimistic, as shown when about nine out of ten millennials surveyed by the Pew Research Center said that they currently have enough money or that they will eventually reach their long-term financial goals.

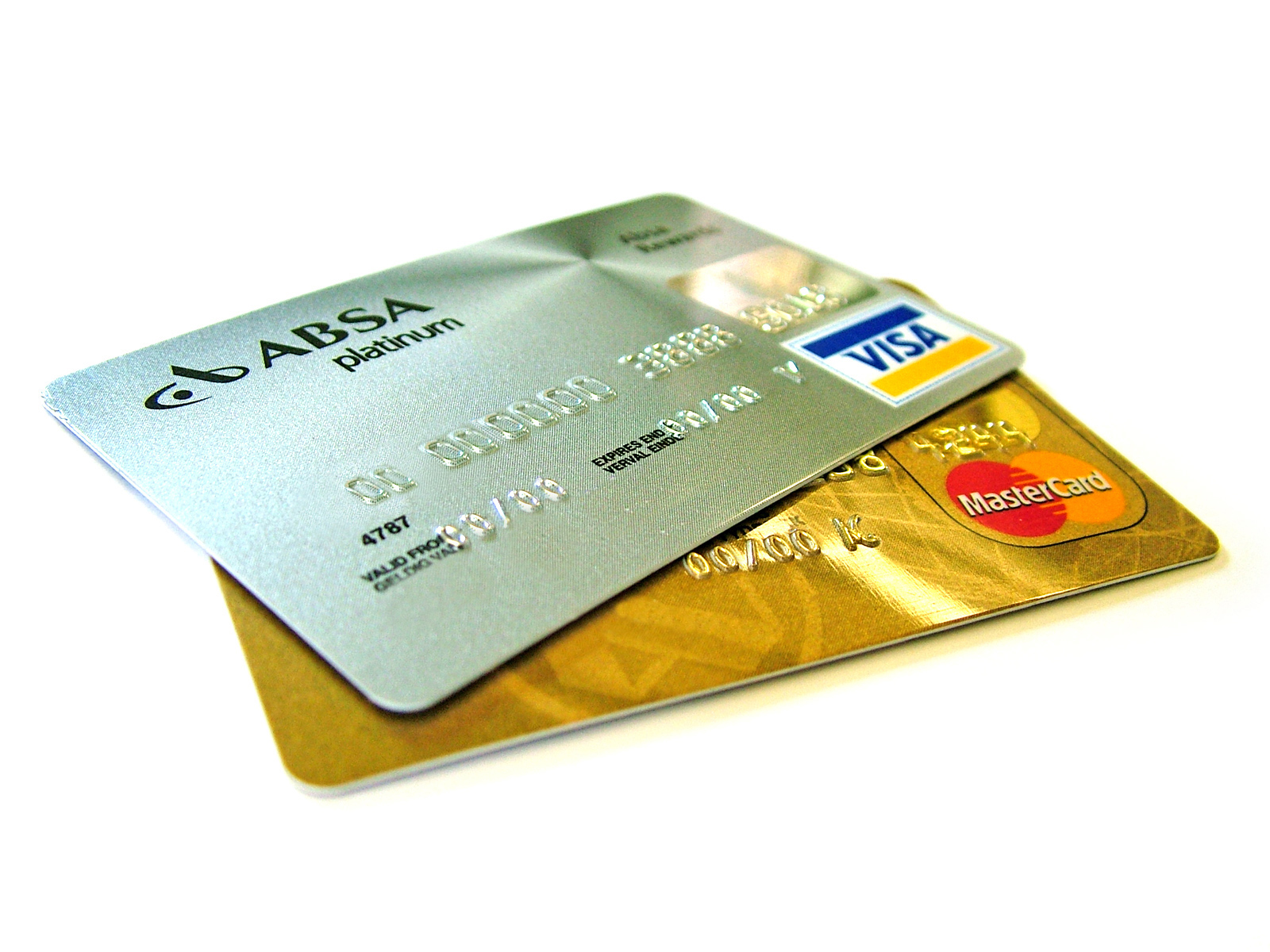
Millennials' debts are not mainly due to student loans but rather credit-card debts.

According to a 2019 TD Ameritrade survey of 1,015 U.S. adults aged 23 and older with at least US$10,000 in investable assets, two thirds of people aged 23 to 38 (millennials) felt they were not saving enough for retirement, and the top reason why was expensive housing (37%). This was especially true for millennials with families. 21% said student debt prevented them from saving for the future. For comparison, this number was 12% for Generation X and 5% for the Baby Boomers. While millennials are well known for taking out large amounts of student loans, these are actually not their main source of non-mortgage personal debt, but rather credit card debt. According to a 2019 Harris poll, the average non-mortgage personal debt of millennials was US$27,900, with credit card debt representing the top source at 25%. For comparison, mortgages were the top source of debt for the Baby Boomers and Generation X (28% and 30%, respectively) and student loans for Generation Z (20%).

According to the U.S. Department of Labor, the unemployment rate in September 2019 was 3.5%, a number not seen since December 1969. For comparison, unemployment attained a maximum of 10% after the Great Recession in October 2009. At the same time, labor participation remained steady and most job growth tended to be full-time positions. Economists generally consider a population with an unemployment rate lower than 4% to be fully employed. In fact, even people with disabilities or prison records are getting hired. Between June 2018 and June 2019, the U.S. economy added a minimum of 56,000 jobs (February 2019) and a maximum of 312,000 jobs (January 2019). The average monthly job gain between the same period was about 213,600. Tony Bedikian, managing director and head of global markets at Citizens Bank, said this is the longest period of economic expansion on record. At the same time, wages continue to grow, especially for low-income earners. On average, they grew by 2.7% in 2016 and 3.3% in 2018. However, the Pew Research Center found that the average wage in the U.S. in 2018 remained more or less the same as it was in 1978, when the seasons and inflation are taken into consideration. Real wages grew only for the top 90th percentile of earners and to a lesser extent the 75th percentile (in 2018 dollars). Nevertheless, these developments ease fears of an upcoming recession. Moreover, economists believe that job growth could slow to an average of just 100,000 per month and still be sufficient to keep up with population growth and keep economic recovery going. As long as firms keep hiring and wages keep growing, consumer spending should prevent another recession. Millennials are expected to make up approximately half of the U.S. workforce by 2020.

As they saw their economic prospects improved in the aftermath of the Great Recession, the COVID-19 global pandemic hit, forcing lock-down measures that resulted in an enormous number of people losing their jobs. For millennials, this is the second major economic downturn in their adult lives so far. However, by early 2022, as the pandemic waned, workers aged 25 to 64 were returning to the work force at a steady pace. According to the Economist, if the trend continued, then their work-force participation would return to the pre-pandemic level of 83% by the end of 2022. Even so, the U.S. economy would continue to face labor shortages, which puts workers at an advantage while contributing to inflation.

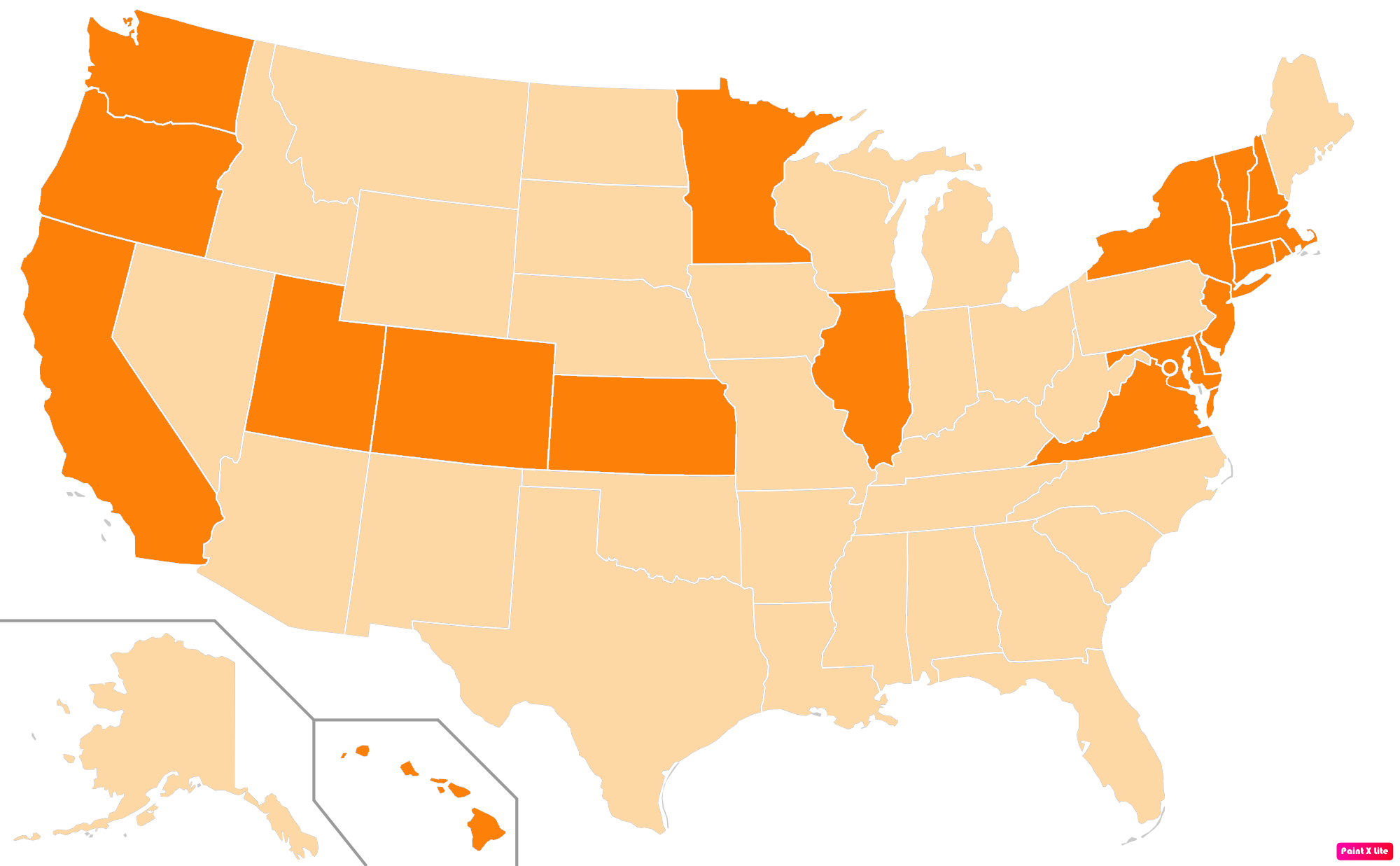
U.S. states by the percentage of the over 25-year-old population with bachelor's degrees according to the U.S. Census Bureau American Community Survey 2013–2017 5-Year Estimates. States with above average shares of degree holders are in full orange.

Human capital is the engine of economic growth. With this in mind, urban researcher Richard Florida and his collaborators analyzed data from the U.S. Census from between 2012 and 2017 and found that the ten cities with the largest shares of adults with a bachelor's degree or higher are Seattle (63%), San Francisco, the District of Columbia, Raleigh, Austin, Minneapolis, Portland, Denver, Atlanta, and Boston (48%). More specifically, the ten cities with the largest shares of people with graduate degrees are the District of Columbia (33%), Seattle, San Francisco, Boston, Atlanta, Minneapolis, Portland, Denver, Austin, and San Diego (19%). These are the leading information technology hubs of the United States. Cities with the lowest shares of college graduates tend to be from the Rust Belt, such as Detroit, Memphis, and Milwaukee, and the Sun Belt, such as Las Vegas, Fresno, and El Paso. Meanwhile, the ten cities with the fastest growth in the shares of college-educated adults are Miami (46%), Austin, Fort Worth, Las Vegas, Denver, Charlotte, Boston, Mesa, Nashville, and Seattle (25%). More specifically, those with the fastest growing shares of adults with graduate degrees are Miami (47%), Austin, Raleigh, Charlotte, San Jose, Omaha, Seattle, Fresno, Indianapolis, and Sacramento (32%).

Florida and his team also found, using U.S. Census data between 2005 and 2017, an increase in employment across the board for members of the "creative class"—people in education, healthcare, law, the arts, technology, science, and business, not all of whom have a university degree—in virtually all U.S. metropolitan areas with a population of a million or more. Indeed, the total number of the creative class grew from 44 million in 2005 to over 56 million in 2017. Florida suggested that this could be a "tipping point" in which talents head to places with a high quality of life yet lower costs of living than well-established creative centers, such as New York City and Los Angeles, what he called the "superstar cities".

According to the Department of Education, people with technical or vocational training are slightly more likely to be employed than those with a bachelor's degree and significantly more likely to be employed in their fields of specialty. The United States currently suffers from a shortage of skilled tradespeople. As of 2019, the most recent data from the U.S. government reveals that there are over half a million vacant manufacturing jobs in the country, a record high, thanks to an increasing number of Baby Boomers entering retirement. But in order to attract new workers to overcome this "Silver Tsunami", manufacturers need to debunk a number of misconceptions about their industries. For example, the American public tends to underestimate the salaries of manufacturing workers. Nevertheless, the number of people doubting the viability of American manufacturing has declined to 54% in 2019 from 70% in 2018, the L2L Manufacturing Index measured. After the Great Recession, the number of U.S. manufacturing jobs reached a minimum of 11.5 million in February 2010. It rose to 12.8 million in September 2019. It was 14 million in March 2007. As of 2019, manufacturing industries made up 12% of the U.S. economy, which is increasingly reliant on service industries, as is the case for other advanced economies around the world. Nevertheless, twenty-first-century manufacturing is increasingly sophisticated, using advanced robotics, 3D printing, cloud computing, among other modern technologies, and technologically savvy employees are precisely what employers need. Four-year university degrees are unnecessary; technical or vocational training, or perhaps apprenticeships would do.

According to the Bureau of Labor Statistics, the occupations with the highest median annual pay in the United States in 2018 included medical doctors (especially psychiatrists, anesthesiologists, obstetricians and gynecologists, surgeons, and orthodontists), chief executives, dentists, information system managers, chief architects and engineers, pilots and flight engineers, petroleum engineers, and marketing managers. Their median annual pay ranged from about US$134,000 (marketing managers) to over US$208,000 (aforementioned medical specialties). Meanwhile, the occupations with the fastest projected growth rate between 2018 and 2028 are solar cell and wind turbine technicians, healthcare and medical aides, cyber security experts, statisticians, speech–language pathologists, genetic counselors, mathematicians, operations research analysts, software engineers, forest fire inspectors and prevention specialists, post-secondary health instructors, and phlebotomists. Their projected growth rates are between 23% (medical assistants) and 63% (solar cell installers); their annual median pays range from roughly US$24,000 (personal care aides) to over US$108,000 (physician assistants). Occupations with the highest projected numbers of jobs added between 2018 and 2028 are healthcare and personal aides, nurses, restaurant workers (including cooks and waiters), software developers, janitors and cleaners, medical assistants, construction workers, freight laborers, marketing researchers and analysts, management analysts, landscapers and groundskeepers, financial managers, tractor and truck drivers, and medical secretaries. The total numbers of jobs added ranges from 881,000 (personal care aides) to 96,400 (medical secretaries). Annual median pays range from over US$24,000 (fast-food workers) to about US$128,000 (financial managers).

Despite economic recovery and despite being more likely to have a bachelor's degree or higher, millennials are at a financial disadvantage compared to the Baby Boomers and Generation X because of the Great Recession and expensive higher education. Income has become less predictable due to the rise of short-term and freelance positions. According to a 2019 report from the non-partisan non-profit think tank New America, a household headed by a person under 35 in 2016 had an average net worth of almost US$11,000, compared to US$20,000 in 1995. According to the St. Louis Federal Reserve, an average millennial (20 to 35 in 2016) owned US$162,000 of assets, compared to US$198,000 for Generation X at the same age (20 to 35 in 2001). Risk management specialist and business economist Olivia S. Mitchell of the University of Pennsylvania calculated that in order to retire at 50% of their last salary before retirement, millennials will have to save 40% of their incomes for 30 years. She told CNBC, "Benefits from Social Security are 76% higher if you claim at age 70 versus 62, which can substitute for a lot of extra savings." Maintaining a healthy lifestyle—avoiding smoking, over-drinking, and sleep deprivation—should prove beneficial.

=== Housing ===
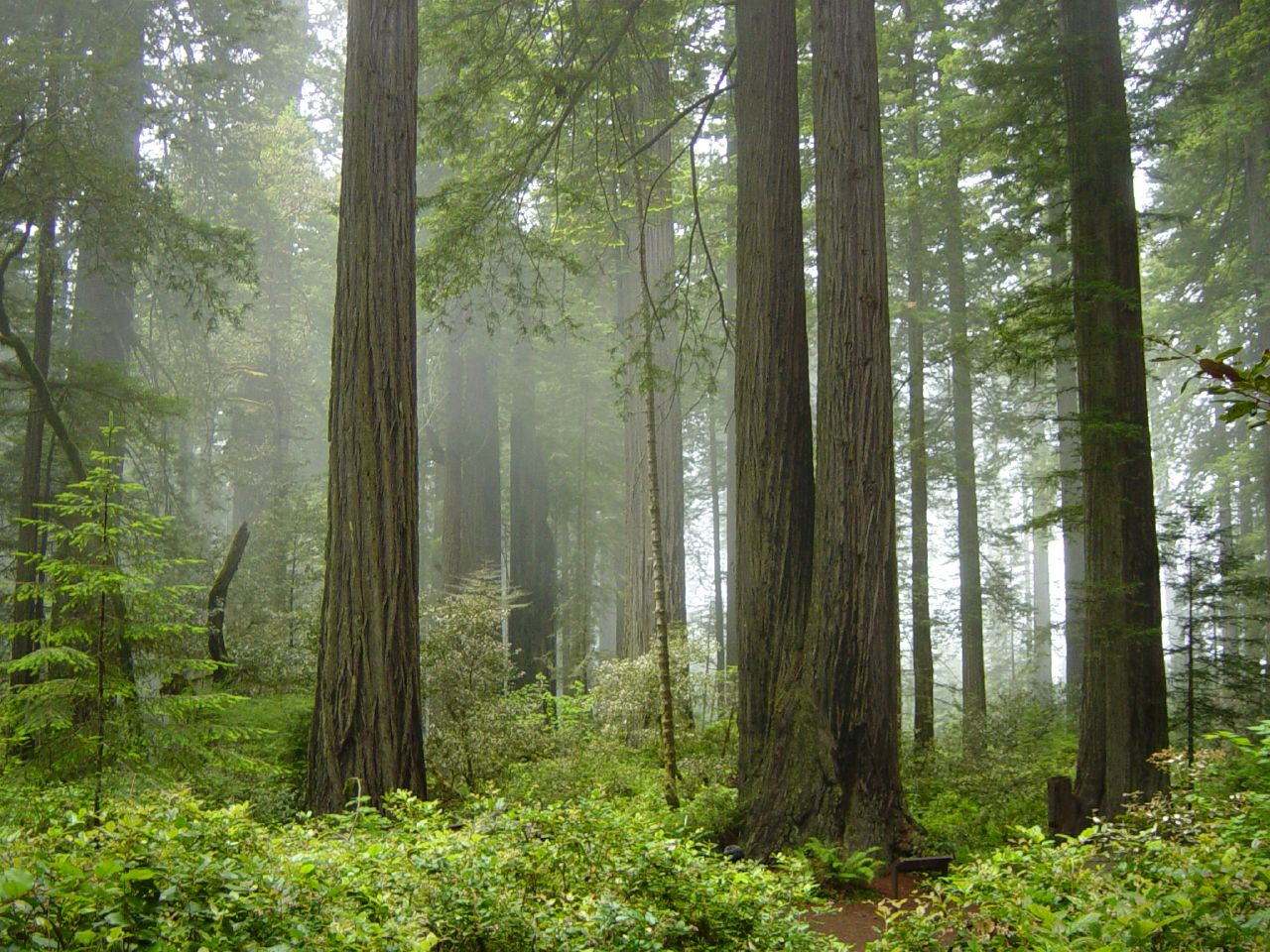
A rural county's chances of having a performing arts organization is 60% higher if it is located near a national park or forest. Pictured: The Redwood National and State Parks, California.

Despite the availability of affordable housing, and broadband Internet, the possibility of telecommuting, the reality of high student loan debts and the stereotype of living in their parents' basement, millennials were steadily leaving rural counties for urban areas for lifestyle and economic reasons in the early 2010s. At that time, millennials were responsible for the so-called "back-to-the-city" trend. Between 2000 and 2010, the number of Americans living in urban areas grew from 79% to 81% while that in rural areas dropped from 21% to 19%. At the same time, many new cities were born, especially in the Midwest, and others, such as Charlotte, North Carolina, and Austin, Texas, were growing enormously. According to demographer William Frey of the Brookings Institution, the population of young adults (18–34 years of age) in U.S. urban cores increased 5% between 2010 and 2015, the bulk of which can be attributed to ethnic-minority millennials. In fact, this demographic trend was making American cities and their established suburbs more ethnically diverse. On the other hand, white millennials were the majority in emerging suburbs and exurbs. Mini-apartments, initially found mainly in Manhattan, became more and more common in other major urban areas as a strategy for dealing with high population density and high demand for housing, especially among people living alone. The size of a typical mini-apartment is 300 square feet (28 square meters), or roughly the size of a standard garage and one eighth the size of an average single-family home in the U.S. as of 2013. Many young city residents were willing to give up space in exchange for living in a location they liked. Such apartments are also common in Tokyo and some European capitals. Data from the Census Bureau reveals that in 2018, 34% of American adults below the age of 35 owned a home, compared to the national average of almost 64%.

Yet by the late 2010s, things changed. Like older generations, millennials reevaluate their life choices as they age. Millennials no longer felt attracted by cosmopolitan metropolitan areas the way they once did. A 2018 Gallup poll found that despite living in a highly urbanized country, most Americans would rather live in rural counties than the cities. While rural America lacked the occupational diversity offered by urban America, multiple rural counties can still match one major city in terms of economic opportunities. In addition, rural towns suffered from shortages of certain kinds of professionals, such as medical doctors, and young people moving in, or back, could make a difference for both themselves and their communities. The slower pace of life and lower costs of living were both important.

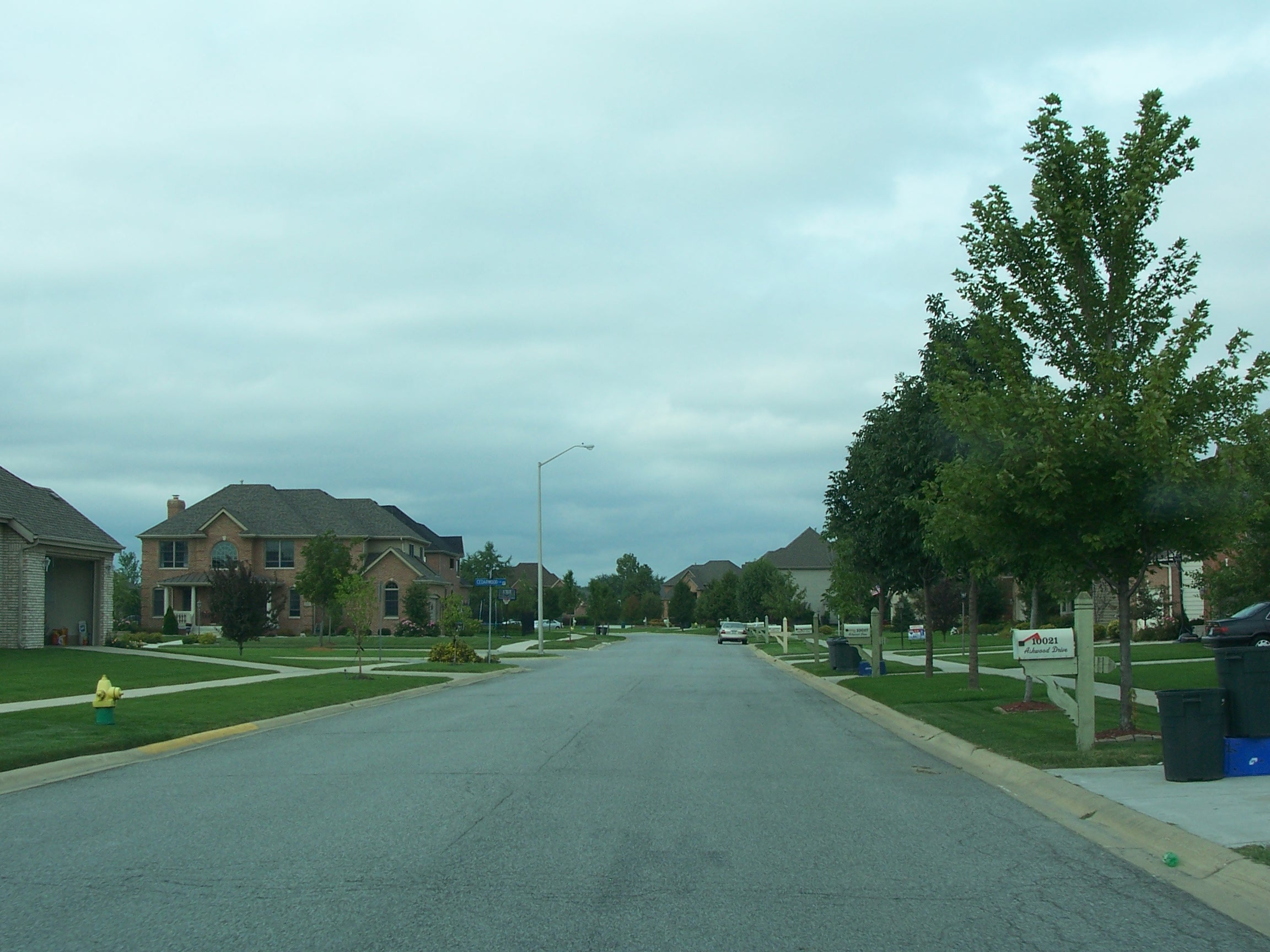
Young Americans are leaving the cities for the suburbs in large numbers. Pictured: Munster, Indiana (near Chicago, Illinois).

By analyzing U.S. Census data, demographer William H. Frey at the Brookings Institution found that, following the Great Recession, American suburbs grew faster than dense urban cores. For example, for every one person who moved to New York City, five moved out to one of its suburbs. Data released by the U.S. Census Bureau in 2017 revealed that Americans aged 25–29 were 25% more likely to move from a city to a suburb than the other way around; for older millennials, that number was 50%. Economic recovery and easily obtained mortgages help explain this phenomenon. Millennial homeowners are more likely to be in the suburbs than the cities. This trend will likely continue as more and more millennials purchase a home. 2019 was the fourth year in a row where the number of millennials living in the major American cities declined measurably. Exurbs are increasingly popular among millennials, too. According to Karen Harris, managing director at Bain Macro Trends, at the current rate of growth, exurbs will have more people than cities for the first time in 2025. In 2018, 80,000 millennials left the nation's largest cities. Among the Baby Boomers who have retired, a significant portion opts to live in the suburbs, where the Millennials are also moving to in large numbers as they have children of their own. These confluent trends increase the level of economic activities in the American suburbs.

While 14% of the U.S. population relocate at least once each year, Americans in their 20s and 30s are more likely to move than retirees, according to Frey. People leaving the big cities generally look for places with low cost of living, including housing costs, warmer climates, lower taxes, better economic opportunities, and better school districts for their children. Economics of space is also important, now that it has become much easier to transmit information and that e-commerce and delivery services have contracted perceived distances. Places in the South and Southwestern United States are especially popular. In some communities, millennials and their children are moving in so quickly that schools and roads are becoming overcrowded. This rising demand pushes prices upwards, making affordable housing options less plentiful. Historically, between the 1950s and 1980s, Americans left the cities for the suburbs because of crime. Suburban growth slowed because of the Great Recession but picked up pace afterwards. According to the Brookings Institution, overall, American cities with the largest net losses in their millennial populations were New York City, Los Angeles, and Chicago, while those with the top net gains were Houston, Denver, and Dallas. According to Census data, Los Angeles County in particular lost 98,608 people in 2018, the single biggest loss in the nation. Moving trucks (U-Haul) are in extremely high demand in the area.

High taxes and high cost of living are also reasons why people are leaving entire states behind. As is the case with cities, young people are the most likely to relocate. For example, a 2019 poll by Edelman Intelligence of 1,900 residents of California found that 63% of millennials said they were thinking about leaving the Golden State and 55% said they wanted to do so within five years. 60% of millennials said the reason why they wanted to move as the cost and availability of housing. In 2018, the median home price in California was US$547,400, about twice the national median. California also has the highest marginal income tax rate of all U.S. states, 12%, plus a subcharge of 1% for those earning a million dollars a year or more. Popular destinations include Oregon, Nevada, Arizona, and Texas, according to California's Legislative Analyst's Office. By analyzing data provided by the Internal Revenue Service (IRS), finance company SmartAsset found that for wealthy millennials, defined as those no older than 35 years of age earning at least US$100,000 per annum, the top states of departure were New York, Illinois, Virginia, Massachusetts, and Pennsylvania, while the top states of destination were California, Washington State, Texas, Colorado, and Florida. SmartAsset also found that the cities with the largest percentages of millennial homeowners in 2018 were Anchorage, AK; Gilbert and Peoria, AZ; Palmdale, Moreno Valley, Hayward, and Garden Grove, CA; Cape Floral, FL; Sioux Falls, SD; and Midland, TX. Among these cities, millennial home-owning rates were between 57% (Gilbert, AZ) and 34% (Hayward, CA). The median price of a home purchased by millennials in 2019 was $256,500, compared to $160,600 for Generation Z. Broadly speaking, the two demographic cohorts are migrating in opposite directions, with the millennials moving North and Generation Z going South.

Average home sizes was declining between the early- and late-2010s. Nevertheless, entry-level homes, which almost ceased to exist due to the housing bubble, started to return in numbers as builders respond to rising demand from millennials. In order to cut construction costs, builders offer few to no options for floor plans. Previously, the Great Recession forced millennials delay home ownership. But by the late 2010s, older millennials had accumulated sufficient savings and were ready to buy a home, get married, and have children. Prices have risen in the late 2010s due to high demand, but this could attract more companies to enter the business of building affordable homes.

As a consequence of the COVID-19 pandemic in the United States, interest in suburban properties skyrocketed, with millennials being the largest block of buyers. In May 2020, when the real-estate market was recovering, searches for suburban properties rose 13%, or twice the rate for urban areas. This trend was observed in more than 50 of the largest 100 American metropolitan areas. In New York City, for example, demand for apartment units in Manhattan nosedived at an annualized rate of 80% in May. As more and more people reconsider whether they would like to live in a densely populated urban environment with high-rise apartments, cultural amenities, and shared spaces rather than a suburban single-family home with their own backyard, the homebuilding industry was seeing better recovery than expected. As millennials and senior citizens increasingly demand affordable housing outside the major cities, to prevent another housing bubble, banks and regulators have restricted lending to filter out speculators and those with bad credit.

By the time they neared midlife in the early 2020s, the bulk of older American millennials had entered the housing market. Polling commissioned by CNBC suggested that by February 2021 59% of those born from 1981 to 1988 owned their own home. Most of this group had owned a home for more than five years whilst the vast majority had used a mortgage to help fund their purchase. However, the research also indicated that 28% of individuals in this age range were renting whilst 12% still lived with their parents or other family. Members of this cohort were less likely to be homeowners than their elders had at the same age. Individuals with tertiary education were substantially more likely to own a home than those without it. Those of black and Hispanic ethnicity were slightly less likely to be homeowners than their white counterparts. The most common reason responders gave for not having bought a home was lack of sufficient savings.
