= Dumb insolence =

Silent disrespect

Dumb insolence is an offence against military discipline in which a subordinate displays an attitude of defiance towards a superior without open disagreement. It is also found in settings such as education in which obedience and deference to a teacher is expected but may be refused by unruly pupils. For example, a pupil may suck their teeth, sigh or walk away while being spoken to.

== See also ==
- Malicious compliance
- Passive aggression
- Stonewalling
- The Good Soldier Švejk
