= John Gottman =

American psychologist (born 1942)

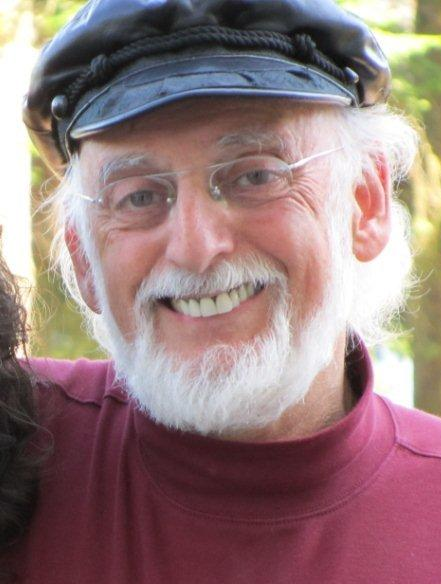
- Born: John Mordechai Gottman; April 26, 1942 (age 84); Dominican Republic
- Education: Fairleigh Dickinson University (BS); Massachusetts Institute of Technology (MS); University of Wisconsin (MA, PhD)
- Known for: Cascade Model of Relational Dissolution
- Spouse: Julie Schwartz Gottman
- Children: Moriah Gottman
- Scientific career
- Fields: Psychology
- Workplaces: University of Washington
- Website: www.gottman.com

John Mordechai Gottman (born April 26, 1942) is an American psychologist and professor emeritus of psychology at the University of Washington. His research focuses on divorce prediction and marital stability through relationship analyses. Gottman's work is centered on the field of relationship counseling: enhanced relationship functioning and mitigation of behaviors detrimental to human relationships. Gottman's work has also contributed to the development of important concepts on social sequence analysis.

In 1996, Gottman co-founded and led The Gottman Institute alongside his wife, psychologist Julie Schwartz Gottman. Together, they are the co-founders of Affective Software Inc., a program seeking to make marriage and relationship counseling procedures more accessible to a broader audience.

== Personal life ==
John Gottman was born on April 26, 1942, in the Dominican Republic to Orthodox Jewish parents. His father was a rabbi in pre-World War II Vienna. Gottman was educated in a Lubavitch Yeshiva Elementary School in Brooklyn. Gottman practices Conservative Judaism, keeps kosher (follows Jewish dietary laws) and observes Shabbat.

In 1987, he married Julie Schwartz, a psychotherapist. His two previous marriages had ended in divorce. He has a daughter named Moriah Gottman. John and Julie Gottman live in Washington state.

== Education and work experience ==
John Gottman received his bachelor's degree in Mathematics-Physics from Fairleigh Dickinson University in 1962. In 1964, he earned his master's in Mathematics-Psychology from the Massachusetts Institute of Technology. He received a second master's degree in Clinical Psychology-Mathematics in 1967, and a PhD in Clinical Psychology in 1971 from the University of Wisconsin–Madison.

At Fairleigh Dickinson University, Gottman worked as an instructor for the mathematics department, a research assistant for the department of physics, and a researcher for the school of engineering. At the Lawrence Radiation Laboratory, he worked as a computer programmer and mathematician. He was a program evaluator and research designer for the Wisconsin Department of Public Instruction. In 1981, Gottman became a professor of psychology at the University of Illinois. Additionally, he was a professor of psychology at the University of Washington for 16 years. Since 2002, Gottman, now an emeritus professor of psychology at UW, has served as the executive director for the Relationship Research Institute in Seattle.

== Awards and honors ==
Gottman has been the recipient of four National Institute of Mental Health Research Scientist Awards: the American Association for Marriage and Family Therapy Distinguished Research Scientist Award, the American Family Therapy Academy Award for Most Distinguished Contributor to Family Systems Research, the American Psychological Association Division of Family Psychology, Presidential Citation for Outstanding Lifetime Research Contribution and the National Council of Family Relations, 1994 Burgess Award for Outstanding Career in Theory and Research. In addition, Gottman was chosen as one of the Psychotherapy Networker's Top 10 Most Influential Therapists of the past quarter-century.

In 2021, Gottman received an honorary Doctor of Science degree from the University of Wisconsin–Madison.

== Works ==
Gottman has published over 190 papers, and is the author or co-author of 40 books.

- Nan Silver; Gottman, John (1994). Why Marriages Succeed or Fail: What You Can Learn from the Breakthrough Research to Make Your Marriage Last. New York: Simon & Schuster. ISBN 978-0-671-86748-5.
- Joan Declaire; Gottman, John (1997). The Heart of Parenting: How to Raise an Emotionally Intelligent Child. New York: Simon & Schuster. ISBN 978-0-684-80130-8.
- The Marriage Clinic (W.W. Norton, 1999), W W Norton page
- Nan Silver; Gottman, John (1999). The Seven Principles for Making Marriage Work. New York: Three Rivers Press. ISBN 978-0-609-80579-4. – a New York Times bestseller
- Gottman, John; Joan Declaire (2001). The Relationship Cure: A Five-Step Guide for Building Better Connections with Family, Friends, and Lovers. New York: Crown Publishers. ISBN 978-0-609-60809-8.
- Anne Gartlan; Julie Schwartz Gottman; Joan Declaire (2006). Ten Lessons to Transform Your Marriage: America's Love Lab Experts Share Their Strategies for Strengthening Your Relationship. Random House Audio. ISBN 978-0-7393-3237-5.
- Julie Schwartz Gottman; Gottman, John (2008). And Baby Makes Three: The Six-Step Plan for Preserving Marital Intimacy and Rekindling Romance After Baby Arrives. New York: Three Rivers Press. ISBN 978-1-4000-9738-8.
- Gottman, John (2011). The Science of Trust: Emotional Attunement for Couples. New York: W. W. Norton & Company. ISBN 978-0-393-70595-9.
- Gottman, John; Silver, Nan (2012). What Makes Love Last. New York: Simon & Schuster. p. 305. ISBN 978-1451608489.
- Gottman, John; Gottman, Julie Schwartz (2015). 10 Principles for Doing Effective Couples Therapy. New York: W.W. Norton & Company. ISBN 978-0393708356
- Gottman, John; Gottman, Julie Schwartz; Abrams, Douglas; Abrams, Rachel Carlton (2016). The Man's Guide to Women. New York: Rodale. ISBN 978-1-62336-184-6.
- Gottman, John; Gottman, Julie Schwartz (2018). The Science of Couples and Family Therapy: Behind the Scenes at the "Love Lab". New York: W.W. Norton & Company. ISBN 978-0393712742.
- Gottman, John (2019). Eight Dates: To Keep Your Relationship Happy, Thriving and Lasting. Penguin. ISBN 978-0241988350.

== Critiques ==
Gottman has been criticized for describing his work as being able to accurately predict divorce. Generally, this type of work involves simply fitting statistical models to a data set, not making predictions about events in the future. In 2001, professor Richard E. Heyman from New York University analyzed 15 divorce prediction models and questioned their validity due to problems with overfitting and small sample sizes (n = 60 couples in Gottman's 1998 study). Heyman argued that a 90% prediction may actually mean much less when considering the possibility of false positives and the low base rates of divorce. He also argued that it is inappropriate to make claims of "predictive power" without validating the model on independent samples. Heyman showed his points by creating a divorce prediction model with a data set, and demonstrated its low validity when the above considerations are tested. Gottman never published a reply to this critique. Journalist Laurie Abraham also disputed the prediction power of Gottman's method. Abraham writes, "What Gottman did wasn't really a prediction of the future but a formula built after the couples' outcomes were already known. This isn't to say that developing such formulas isn't a valuable — indeed, a critical — first step in being able to make a prediction. The next step, however —one absolutely required by the scientific method— is to apply your equation to a fresh sample to see whether it actually works. That is especially necessary with small data slices (such as 57 couples), because patterns that appear important are more likely to be mere flukes. But Gottman never did that." The Gottman Relationship Institute claims that six out of the seven of Gottman's studies have been properly predictive, by a non-standard definition of prediction in which all that is required is that predictive variables, but not their specific relationship to the outcome, were selected in advance.

== See also ==
- Thin-slicing
- Julie Schwartz Gottman
