= Listening behaviour types =

Types of listening skills

The different types of listening skills used in human communication include: However, in addition to the acoustic message, visual stimuli would also be processed, as well as information about the sound source and the social situation.

1. Active listening
2. Appreciative listening
3. Dialogic listening
4. Informative listening
5. Reflective listening
6. Workplace listening
