= Listening =

Hearing what others are saying, and trying to understand what it means

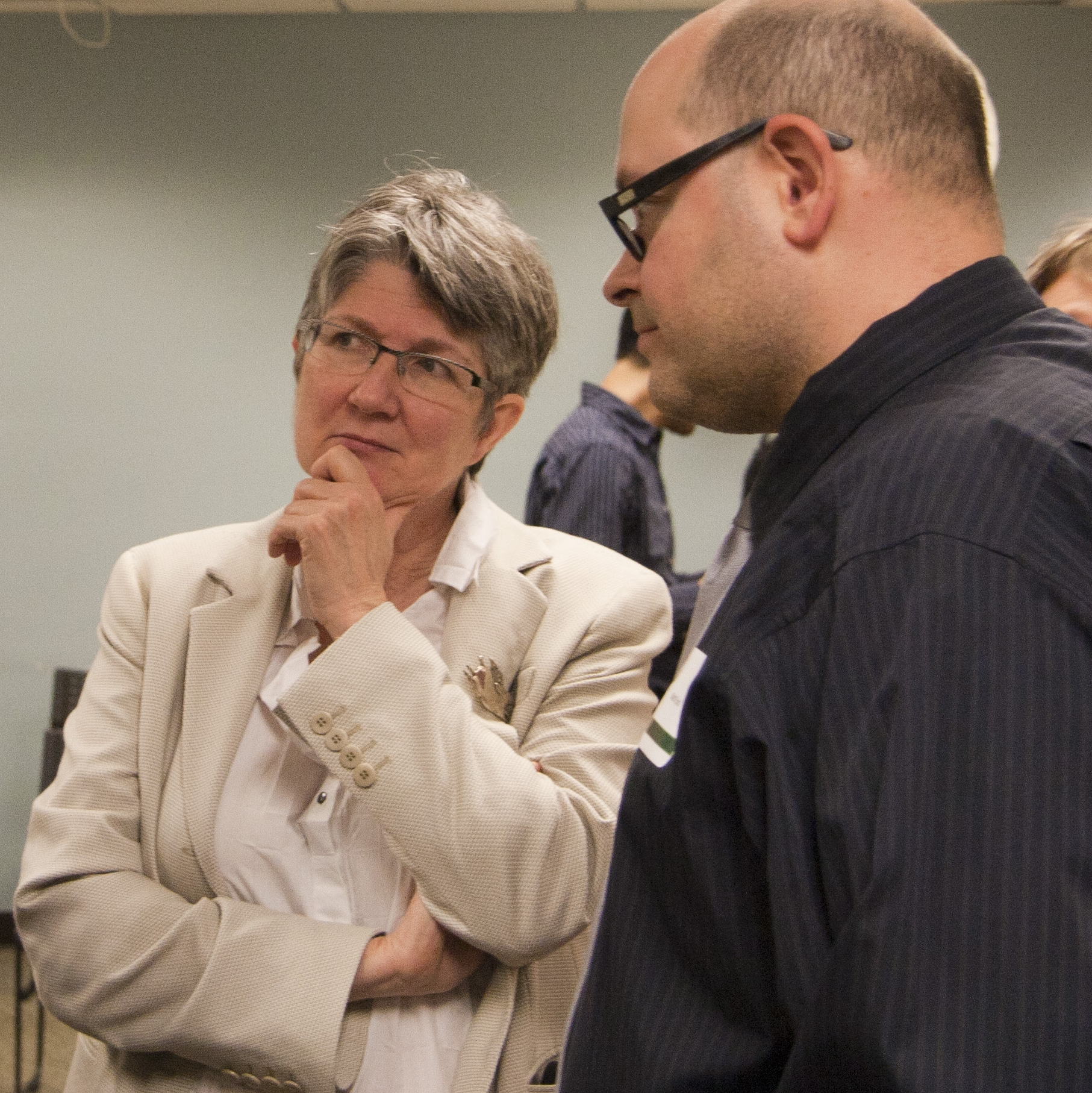
Listening in conversation.

Listening is the act of paying attention to sounds. While often described as attention to sound, listening is increasingly understood as an interpretive process shaped by context and prior experience. It includes listening to the sounds of nature, listening to music, and perhaps most importantly, interpersonal listening, i.e. listening to other human beings. When listening to another person, one hears what they are saying and tries to understand what it means. Despite its broad applications, discussions of listening in interdisciplinary fields such as sound studies and art remain underrepresented.

Interpersonal listening involves complex affective, cognitive, and behavioral processes. Affective processes include the motivation to listen to others; cognitive processes include attending to, understanding, receiving, and interpreting content and relational messages; and behavioural processes include responding to others with verbal and nonverbal feedback.

Interpersonal listening is a skill for resolving problems. Poor interpersonal listening can lead to misinterpretations, thus causing conflict or dispute. Poor listening can be exhibited by excessive interruptions, inattention, hearing what you want to hear, mentally composing a response, or having a closed mind.

Listening is also linked to memory. According to one study, when there were background noises during a speech, listeners were better able to recall the information in the speech when hearing those noises again. For example, when a person reads or does something else while listening to music, he or she can recall what that was when hearing the music again later.

Listening can function rhetorically as a means of promoting Cross-cultural communication. Because listening is not only a cognitive or behavioral process but is also shaped by social, cultural, and relational contexts. Contemporary approaches emphasize that listening involves interpretation influenced by identity, experience, and power, rather than being a neutral or purely receptive act. In this sense, listening can be understood as a form of recognition that shapes how meaning is received and understood. Krista Ratcliffe (author of "Rhetorical Listening and Cross - Cultural Communication") built her argument upon two incidents in which individuals demonstrated a tendency to refuse the cross-cultural discourses. Listening also involves processes of recognition and misrecognition, where meaning may be affirmed, questioned, or dismissed depending on the listener’s expectations and assumptions.

== Interpersonal listening ==
Interpersonal listening begins by hearing a speaker producing the sound to be listened to. Semiotician Roland Barthes, characterized the distinction between listening and hearing. "Hearing is a physiological phenomenon; listening is a psychological act." People are always hearing, most of the time subconsciously. Listening is done by choice. It is the interpretative action taken by someone in order to understand, and potentially make sense of, something they hear.

Listening differs from obeying. A person who receives and understands information or an instruction, and then chooses not to comply with it or not to agree to it, has listened to the speaker, even though the result is not what the speaker wanted. Interpersonal listening is also shaped by social positioning, where factors such as identity and cultural background influence how individuals are heard and interpreted.

=== Process of listening ===
Listening may be considered as a simple and isolated process, but it would be more precise to perceive it as a complex and systematic process. It involves the perception of sounds made by the speaker, of intonation patterns that focus on the information, and of the relevance of the topic under discussion.

People listen for 45 percent of their time when they communicate.

According to Barthes, listening can be understood on three levels: alerting, deciphering, and understanding how the sound is produced and how it affects the listener.

Alerting
The first level involves detection of environmental sound cues. Certain places have certain sounds associated with them. For example, a home has certain sounds associated with it that makes it familiar and comfortable to the occupant. An intrusion—a sound that is not familiar (e.g., a squeaking door or floorboard, a breaking window)—alerts whoever lives there to potential danger.

Deciphering
The second level involves detecting patterns when interpreting sounds; for example, a child waiting for the sound of his mother's return home. In this scenario the child is waiting to pick up on sound cues (e.g., jingling keys, the turn of the doorknob, etc.) that signal his mother's approach.

Understanding
The third level means knowing how what one says will affect another. This sort of listening is important in psychoanalysis, the study of the unconscious mind. According to Barthes, the psychoanalyst must suspend judgment while listening to the patient in order to communicate with the latter's unconscious without bias. In the same way, lay listeners must suspend judgment when listening to others.

All three levels of listening function within the same plane, and sometimes all at once. The second and third levels overlap and intertwine, in that obtaining, understanding, and deriving meaning are part of the same process. In this way anyone, on hearing a doorknob turn (obtaining), can almost automatically assume that someone is at the door (deriving meaning).

=== Active listening ===
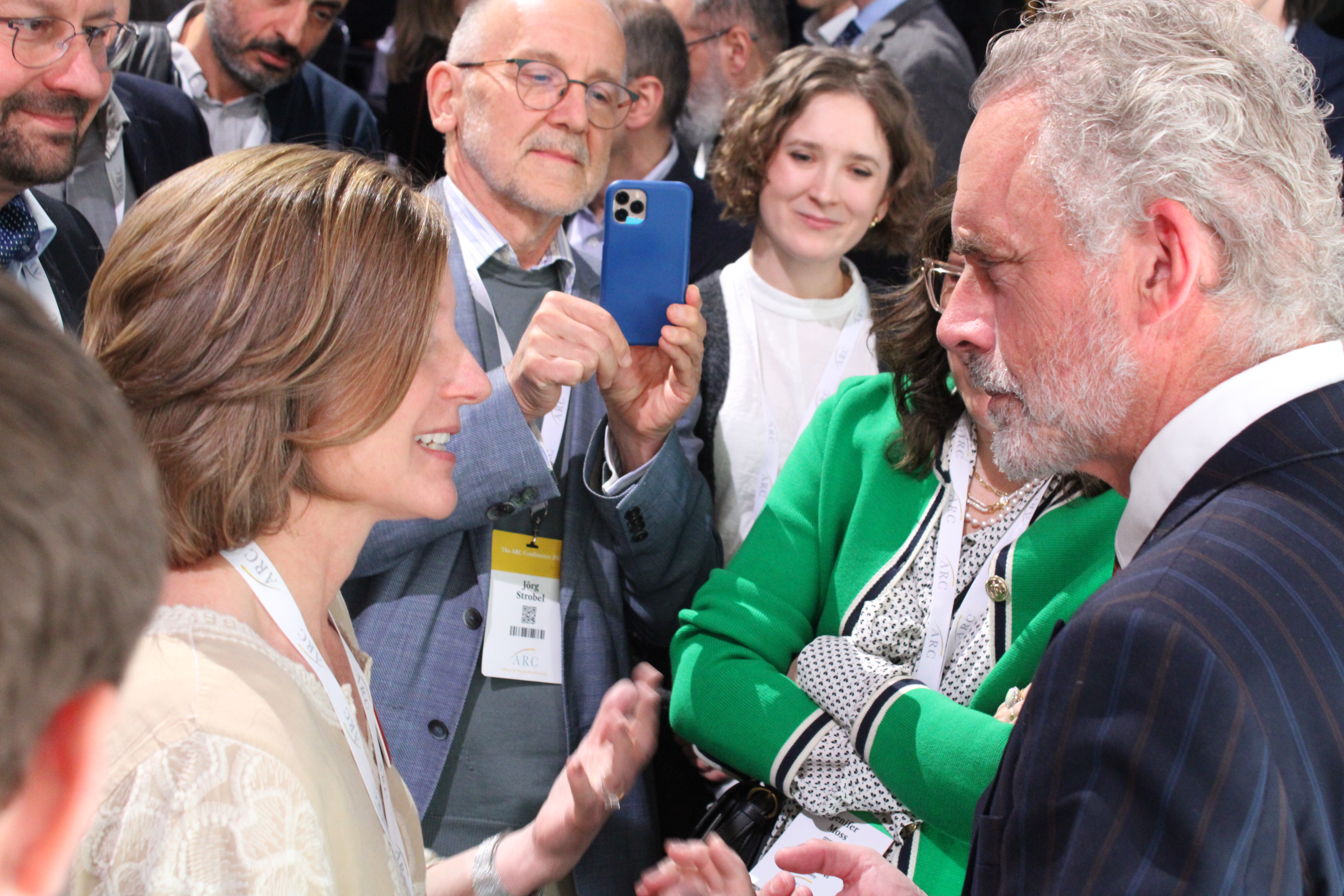
Listener (Jordan Peterson) listening to speaker (Kimberly Ells)

Active listening involves listening to what is being said and attempting to understand it. It can be described in many ways. Active listening requires that the listener be attentive, nonjudgmental, and non-interrupting. An active listener analyzes what the speaker is saying for its implicature or subtext as well as for meanings contained explicitly in the verbal communication. An active listener looks for nonverbal messages from the speaker in order to comprehend the full meaning of what is being said. Active listening has many benefits. It is more effective listening. It also strengthens one's leadership skills.

Active listening is an exchange between two or more individuals. If they are active listeners, the quality of the conversation will be better and clearer. Active listeners connect with each other more efficiently in their conversations. Active listening can create a deeper, more positive relationship between individuals.

Active listening changes the speaker's perspective. Active listening is a catalyst in one's personal growth, which enhances personality change and group development. People will more likely listen to themselves if someone else is allowing them to speak and get their message across.

Active listening allows people to be present in a conversation. "Listening is a key factor in cultivating relationships because the more we understand the other person, the more connection we create, as taught in nonviolent-communication Dharma teachings. As someone recently stated, 'We should listen harder than we speak.'"

=== Listening in language learning ===
Along with speaking, reading, and writing, listening is one of the "four skills" of language learning. All language-teaching approaches, except for grammar translation, incorporate a listening component. Some teaching methods, such as total physical response, involve students simply listening and responding.

In an article published by the Chicago Center for Teaching and Learning Elizabeth Fagan says, "Listening is an important communication competence that includes complex cognitive processes like understanding and interpreting messages, affective processes like being motivated to pay attention, and behavioral processes like responding with both verbal and nonverbal feedback."

In "intensive listening" learners attempt to listen with maximum accuracy to a relatively brief sequence of speech; in "extensive listening" learners listen to lengthy passages for general comprehension. While intensive listening may be more effective for developing specific aspects of listening ability, extensive listening is more effective in building fluency and maintaining learner motivation.

People are usually not conscious of how they listen in their first, or native, language unless they encounter difficulty. A research project focused on facilitating language learning found that L2 (second language) learners, in the process of listening, make conscious use of whatever strategies they unconsciously use in their first language, such as inferring, selective attention, or evaluation.

Factors activated in speech perception include phonetic quality, prosodic patterns, pausing, and speed of input. These all influence the comprehensibility of listening input. A common store of semantic information (single) in memory is used in both first- and second-language speech comprehension, but research has found separate stores of phonological information (dual) for speech. Semantic knowledge required for language understanding (scripts and schemata related to real-world people, places, and actions) is accessed through phonological tagging of whatever language is heard.

In a study, involving 93 participants, investigating the relationship between second-language listening and a range of tasks, it was discovered that listening anxiety was a major obstacle to developing speed and explicitness in second-language listening tasks. Additional research explored whether listening anxiety and comprehension are related, and as the investigators expected they were negatively correlated.

=== Rhetorical listening ===
==== Background ====
Krista Ratcliffe contended that much literacy teaching in the U.S. emphasizes classical Western rhetorical theory that foregrounds speaking and writing but ignores listening. These theories mainly focus on how the rhetor's speech can persuade the audience. The goal of classical rhetoric studies was to address what the audience should listen for, rather than how they listen.

Shari Stenberg extended this perspective to explicate the absence of listening in the academe.

Western teaching methods maintained the inherited rhetorical Greek noun logos, which means reasoning and logic, while ignoring its verb legein that refers to speaking as well as, in etymological term, to lay down, to listen. Listening may occur within two different stances: the divided logos and the restored logos. These differ in how they (re)shape the functions and outcomes of listening. The hearer listens in the divided logos while simultaneously producing their responses to the speaker. Whereas within the restored logos, the listener exploits the listening time to live in someone's else experiences, then reflect on, and make meanings, to offer a response.

An example of divided logos was Aristotle's theory. Despite its concern with teaching students the oral discourse that mandates listening to produce and analyze enthymemes, listening was displaced and diminished. The attention given to speaking without listening "perpetuates a homogenized mode of speech based on competition rather than dialogue." Ratcliffe attributed this listening neglect to Western cultural biases that are represented as: 1) speaking is gendered as masculine while listening as feminine; 2) Listening is subjugated to ethnicity: white people speak while people of color listen; in other words, in cross-cultural relationships, there is one superior member in the conversation who does not need to listen as closely; 3) Western culture prefers to depend on sight, not sound, as its primary interpretative trope. These dynamics are also evident in everyday interactions, where differences in identity and perception shape how individuals are understood or misinterpreted.

==== Defining rhetorical listening ====
Rhetorical listening has also been applied to everyday interactions, where differences in identity and perception can shape how speakers are understood or misinterpreted. Ratcliffe encouraged language scholars to adopt listening as a novel strategy for deriving meaning and comprehending discourses related to gender and race. The primary objective was to facilitate cross-cultural conversations. Ratcliffe defined rhetorical listening as a technique for creative interpretation, originating from a space within language where listeners can assert their influence. This approach utilizes listening as a tool to gain insight into the perspectives and voices of others, promoting interpretation, reflection, and the creation of fresh significance. To this end, Ratcliffe asserted that rhetorical listening embodies a “stance of openness that a person may choose to assume in relation to any person, text, or culture.” As an outcome of this openness, Ratcliffe claimed that rhetorical listening cultivates conscious willingness in people, thereby fostering effective communication, particularly in cross-cultural settings.

Steven Pedersen highlights the negative impact on communication of stereotypes and prejudices, which cause dis-identification. Conversely, rhetorical listening promotes cross-cultural understanding and allows students and teachers to disrupt reciprocal resistance.

Rhetorical listening requires an attentive consideration of individuals' intentions to seek understanding, which surpasses mere passive listening. Stenberg cautioned against interpretative limitations that may arise from such intentions. Within the framework of rhetorical listening, the term "understanding" metaphorically transforms into "standing under"—encompassing a comprehensive view of various perspectives. This vantage point allows for the (re)conceptualization of one's own ideas and ethics. Instead of merely accumulating others' ideas, people cultivate these ideas, thereby enhancing their language skills and evolving their perspectives, ultimately paving the way for new responses.

==== Practicing rhetorical listening in the classroom ====
Based on Krista Ratcliffe's work on rhetorical listening, Meagan Rodgers developed the intent/effect tactic as one way for students to practice rhetorical listening in the English composition classroom. The application of this tool is meant to disrupt racially discriminatory stereotypes and utterances. Rodgers found in her classroom-based research that even if a person does not perceive themselves to be racist, racism or racial stereotypes are subconsciously perpetuated when a majority/dominant group agrees with or laughs at racial differences of a minority group member. Rather than confronting students and jeopardizing their willingness to participate in classroom discussions, the intent/effect strategy invites students to (1) consider numerous perspectives of a statement, and (2) understand that well-meant comments (intent) can be perceived as deleterious (effect) by others.

Another strategy for teachers to practice rhetorical listening and improve cultural sensitivity in the classroom is by applying practices from Deaf Studies. This kind of listening pedagogy requires students (1) to be attentive and reduce distracting noises; (2) share their story, including their cultural background, so that classmates can be familiar with their perspective; (3) engage in “critical dialogue” in order to understand others; and (4) pay attention to their classmates’ body language and the messages it sends.

Rhetorical listening in the classroom can also be used to shed more light onto why students are silent. Janice Cools discusses several reasons for silence in the ESL/ELL composition classroom, such as students holding back their wisdom on purpose to avoid being harassed by peers and instructors for giving a wrong answer. The fear and doubt that can result from this type of response might lead to feelings of incompetence and discomfort in an individual and cause them to continue in silence in the classroom. A further reason why students choose silence is because they were taught to be silent, especially at the secondary school level in some cultures, e.g. Puerto Rico.

Cools suggests asking students in writing why they are (not) silent in their classes, "how [they] interpret other students' silences [...] and what a professor should infer from [students'] silence." Students have told her that silence can be beneficial as it shows their focus on the material, gives them an opportunity to get to know a different perspective while listening to their peers, and allows them to reflect and process questions. Moreover, discussions can be perceived as interruption because classmates do not have expert knowledge. Cools concludes that silence in the classroom should be appreciated and respected.

== Listening to music ==
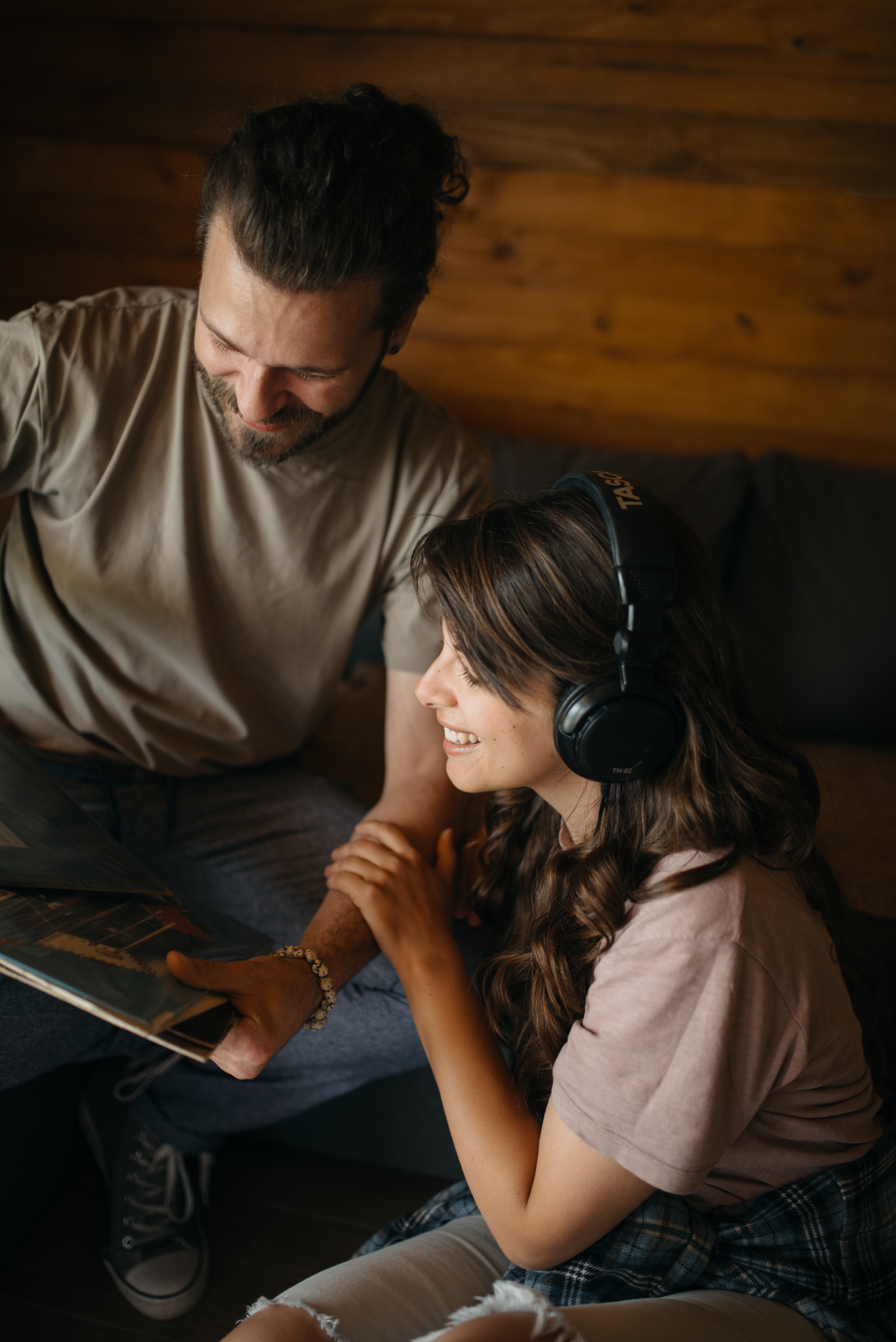
Listening to music

Listening to music can be beneficial in many ways. Some things music can help with is emotional regulation, stress reduction and cognitive enhancement. People listen to many different types of music for a variety of reasons. Many people listen to music when they are driving, cleaning, relaxing, working out and even while working certain jobs. There are numerous genres such as, pop, rock, hip hop and rap, country and R&B. With so many genres it allows individuals to find styles they enjoy and can relate to. Music can also help people with certain diseases and medical conditions. For example, individuals with Alzheimer's disease or dementia may benefit from music because it can help them remain calm and improve their emotional well being. Music therapy is often used in hospice care for similar reasons. When people feel stressed listening to music can help take their minds off what is causing that stress. Research has also shown that listening to music activates different parts of the brain which can contribute to cognitive enhancement. Overall, music plays an important role in improving mental, emotional and cognitive health.

== Listening to nature ==
Listening to nature is the perception and interpretation of natural sounds in the environment around us. These sounds have a significant impact on the human experience and contribute to how people experience certain environments and situations by providing contextual information and supporting situational awareness. Research and studies in reference to environmental sounds suggest that acoustic environments can influence human behavior and affect well-being and quality of life. While environmental sounds have traditionally been studied as sources of noise, more recent research has examined their role in shaping positive experiences and positively influencing everyday environments.

Within natural environments, listening often involves sounds such as birds chirping, the wind blowing, and water running. Research on restorative environments has found that these sounds can enhance perceptions of natural settings and are frequently associated with positive emotional responses. Exposure to natural soundscapes has been linked to improvements in mood, recovery from stress, and certain aspects of cognitive performance, although results vary depending on the environment and study design. Researchers have also suggested that acoustic characteristics and learned associations with nature may contribute to the perceived restorative effects of natural sounds.

== See also ==
- Appreciative listening – Listening behaviour targeting media for enjoyment
- Auditory agnosia – Inability to distinguish sounds
- Auditory processing disorder – Developmental or acquired neurological disorders
- Dialogic listening
- Hearing – Sensory perception of sound by living organisms
- Informational listening – Listening focused on understanding a message
- Pseudolistening – Feigned appearance of active listening
- Workplace listening – Active listening in a professional environment
