= Pseudolistening =

Feigned appearance of active listening

In communication studies, pseudolistening (from pseudo- 'fake') is a barrier to active listening that consists of appearing attentive in conversation while ignoring or only partially listening to the other speaker. As defined by communication scholars, pseudolistening is an “incompetent” way of listening, as it frequently leads to miscommunication because it does not allow listeners to process what is being said. The lack of comprehension makes it difficult to retain what was said in the conversation and even harder to recall information for future encounters. Pseudolistening is often used as a coping mechanism to manage personal needs while appearing attentive to others. While pseudolistening is not always intended to be malicious, it can come across as deceptive and cause others to view a listener as disrespectful. An example of pseudolistening is trying to multitask, talking on the phone to a friend while completing work to meet a deadline in a few hours. In this situation, the individual cannot focus on both tasks, yet may not want to disappoint a friend by dismissing the conversation. Instead, a person may give enough verbal encouragement to seem attentive when most of their focus is on work.

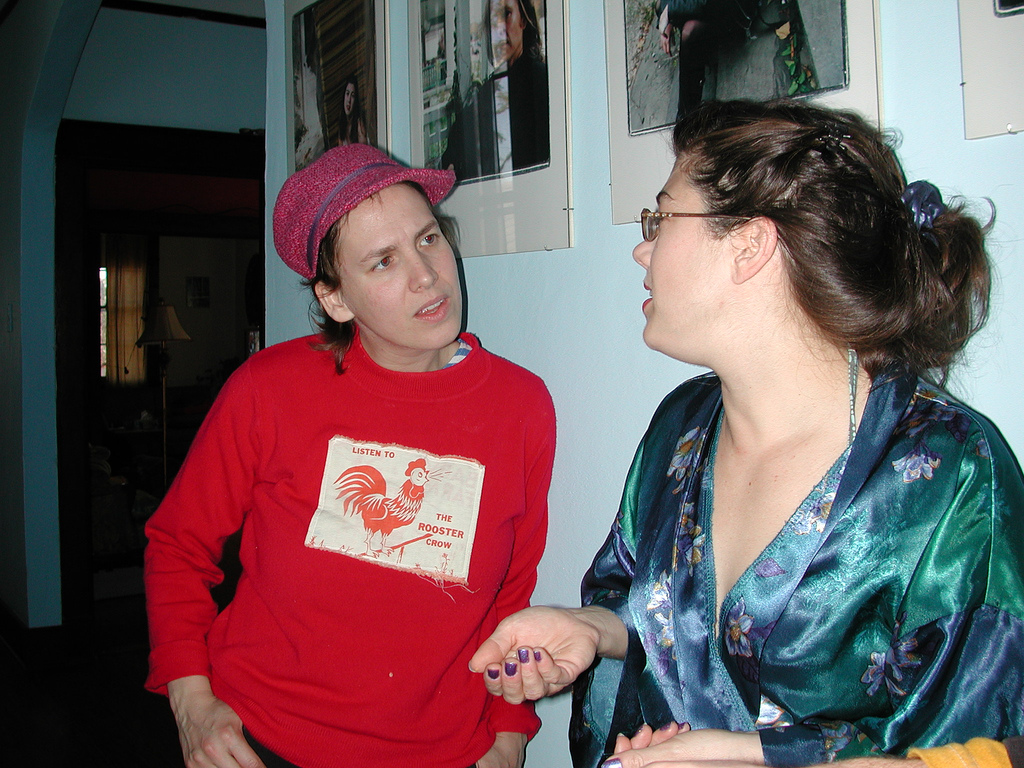
We may appear to be listening when we are not

== Possible reasons ==
People sometimes engage in pseudolistening because of their preexisting familiarity with a topic, which causes a lack of interest in active engagement. An individual might listen out of politeness, aiming to avoid hurting the speaker’s feelings while hoping that their inattention goes unnoticed. Preoccupation with another task or internal thoughts may divide a person’s attention and cause them to not fully be present with a speaker. A listener might also occupy themselves with formulating a potential response to the subject instead of actively concentrating on what is being said.

Listening barriers may increase the chance of pseudolistening, and they occur at every stage of the listening process. They can include environmental distractions such as temperature and lighting, cognitive interferences such as daydreaming or drifting off, lack of listening preparation, and the difference between thought and speech rate. Since people are able to process more words than are spoken, the gap between thought and speech rate makes it impossible to give one message undivided attention. This is because individuals can process multiple thoughts simultaneously. While pseudolistening may seem harmless or even courteous in the moment, consistently engaging in it may negatively affect interpersonal relationships, causing an individual to be viewed as dishonest.

== In comparison to active listening ==
Individuals who are pseudo-listening may include minimal encouragers to compensate for their non-listening, such as nodding their heads, looking at the speaker, smiling at the appropriate times, and displaying other aspects of paying attention, so it may be difficult at times to distinguish between active listening and pseudo-listening. Similarly, broad answers or responses that are not relevant to the topic at hand also give away a pseudo-listener. These responses are known as tangential responses and often run alongside the topic being discussed, but ultimately have nothing to do with the main topic of the discussion.

Active listening is a process that utilizes outwardly visible positive listening behaviors and positive cognitive listening practices. Proper listening is needed to internalize and comprehend material; without this developed skill, there is potential for either pseudolistening or a total lack of listening. There are various aspects responsible for disrupting the active listening process that can contribute to pseudolistening, such as physical and environmental factors (lighting, temperature, etc.), psychological/physiological factors (hunger, anxiety, tiredness, etc.), and cognitive/personal factors (daydreaming, multitasking, etc.). A person actively listening may display nonverbal body language, such as maintaining eye contact or positioning their body towards the speaker. Active listening may also utilize verbal cues, such as "Ok" or "Yes". Real listening is done to understand a person's perspective, enjoy a person's company, learn new information, or provide assistance or comfort, among other things.

== How it affects communication ==
Pseudo-listening is most common in face-to-face communication, but it can also be expressed through phone calls, text messages and e-mails. Effective listening is critical in human communication to build trust and understanding, whereas pseudolistening often results in relational breakdowns due to perceived disinterest or disengagement. Communication is dependent upon both the receiver and the sender to be fully aware of what is being said and heard. When one person projects their thoughts, and the receiver of the message is only pretending to listen, poor communication and possibly misunderstanding often occur. In public speaking contexts, pseudolistening can undermine the speaker's message, as audience members may feign interest without truly engaging with the content, thus affecting the overall effectiveness of the communication. Babies spend their first few years listening to people around them in order to learn language. According to Edwing Llangari, people spend around half their lives listening to others. An article from University of Colorado states that poor listening skills make good communication pretty much impossible to achieve. It says that, "no matter how much care one person or group takes to communicate their concerns, values, interests, or needs in a fair, clear, unthreatening way, if the listener is not willing to receive that information in that way, the communication will fail."

=== With couples ===
There are many negative effects on romantic relationships caused by pseudo-listening. These effects can range from making romantic partners feel upset, inhibiting the partner's ability to effectively solve problems, encouraging an unhealthy dependence on the listener, raising the partner's level of stress, making the relationship, as a whole, less stable, causing the romantic partner to be less satisfied with the relationship, and even causing negative effects on the romantic partner's health. It’s important to recognize that there are two parts to any conversation, the person doing the talking and the person who is trying to actively listen.

=== With parents and children ===
Among families, teenagers engage in pseudo-listening the most. Teenagers may engage in pseudo-listening because they feel they have better things to do. They may also tune into distractions and act like they are listening. In doing so, it is evident that they listen only when they want to listen. Studies show that as people get older, pseudo-listening skills increase. An experiment was done on first-grade and second grade children to see if they could repeat what the teacher had been saying. 90% of first graders and 80% of the second-graders could do so; but when the experiment was repeated with teenagers, only 44% of junior high students and 28% of senior high students could repeat their teachers’ remarks. It is important for parents to have good listening skills, because poor listening from parents can cause the child to be closed off.

=== In a classroom ===
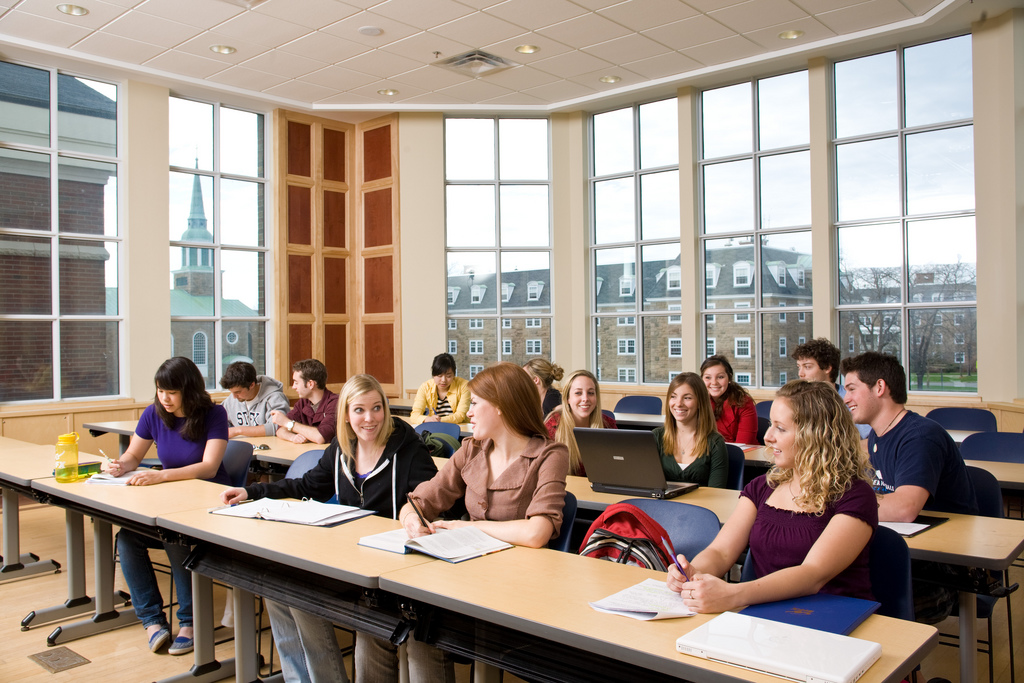
Many students pseudolisten during class due to numerous distractions.

Recent studies reveal that students rarely encounter curriculum focused on learning and developing the skill of listening. It is possible for a student to go through every level of education without ever having a class teaching them how to listen effectively in everyday life. Often students fall victim to pseudo-listening because of all the distractions they have at their fingertips, such as phones, computers, social media, iPods, etc. Students will often pretend to be listening so that the professor of the class does not verbally chastise, or to avoid being perceived as rude. Effective listening from a teacher is a way of showing concern for their subordinates, which fosters cohesive bonds, commitment, and trust: this can help a class to pay attention and learn what is being taught.

=== Leaders ===
Leadership often involves forming a commitment to the people one is leading, and a large part of this is related to active listening. Pseudo-listening undermines this commitment process and leads to ineffective leadership. Many people think they are listening to others all the time, and while they certainly may be hearing what these people are saying, they are engaging in pseudo-listening. Over time, pseudo-listening can not only weaken perceptions of one as a leader, but can contribute to problems active listening could otherwise fix and lead to barriers against success in an organization. Within corporate environments, pseudolistening can detract from organizational effectiveness by impeding the accurate exchange of information, thus highlighting the importance of fostering active listening practices for better corporate communication. Pseudolistening can exacerbate stress and anxiety, leading to a decline in morale and productivity.

== Features that contribute ==
Things such as an accent, height, weight, scars, and even something as small as body posture can all contribute to an audience falling victim to pseudo-listening. Being self-conscious about some of these personal characteristics as a speaker may inhibit the listener's experience. This lack of self-confidence could lead to other distractions made by the speaker. While these physical flaws may lead to disinterest in the reader it could also contribute to nervous actions that may also distract the reader. A few examples of these nervous actions may include but are not limited to clenching your hands, adjusting your hair or clothing, and pacing back and forth while speaking. These actions may lead to a disinterest in the context of a speech and an elevated interest in the person speaking or the environment surrounding them.

Environmental factors can include any aspect of an individual’s surroundings, such as a dark or poorly lit room, uncomfortable seating arrangements, or constant background noise from something like the whirring of an air conditioner. Temperature and seating arrangements can distract an audience by causing them discomfort, shifting their focus to their annoyance. Physical factors involve conditions such as tiredness and fatigue, and ailments such as headaches and colds that can make it difficult to maintain focus. For example, a person giving a speech while experiencing a cold will have a stuffy nose or a recurring cough, which can take the audience's focus from the speaker to their cold. Psychological factors cover stress, negative emotions, personal biases, and preferences that may prevent an individual from listening impartially to a speaker’s perspective. Sometimes, psychological and physical factors combine to cause physical symptoms such as trembling and sweating due to conditions like mental anxiety. The audience can also be influenced by their lives, causing a shift in their focus to what they will eat for lunch, their jobs, personal relationships, etc. These can all overshadow the messages and ideas that the speaker is trying to deliver.

=== Facial features as distractions ===
Because facial hair is a striking characteristic of one's face, people often notice and focus on an individual's facial hair. Because of this, listeners may fall victim to pseudolistening. Instead of making eye contact, listeners might focus on the speaker's mustache or beard instead of actively listening. Facial hair is distracting to both listeners and observers. This concept can also be applied to situations in which a person has something stuck in their teeth, has visible mucus in their nose, or has conspicuous piercings and tattoos on their face.

=== Signs someone is not listening ===
One way to detect pseudolistening is eye fixation: in relaxed conversations, the eye tends to wander or look at other parts of your face. We also tend to smile at one another to reinforce that we agree with them and are listening. The pseudo-listener will do the same but will often smile for too long. During a conversation between two people, their bodies will face each other. A false listener, however, will not have engaged body language; instead, whether their feet face away or they sit next to rather than across from the other person, it is as if their body is trying to escape.

=== Examples ===
- Ambushing: Waiting to trap the speaker in his/her own words or ideas; mostly used to support a belief or to prove something.
- Assimilation to Prior Messages: Believing new messages relate to past messages; forgetting that communication changes.
- Critical Listening: Not to be confused with defensive listening, critical listening is listening to analyze and understand the speaker's messages, written or spoken.
- Defensive Listening: A form of listening where the remarks by the speaker are taken personally, so the listener seeks a way to defend themselves against the perceived attack.
- Filling in the Gaps: After hearing the beginning, assuming that the information given is the whole story.
- Insensitive Listening: Failing to notice hidden meanings or nonverbal cues.
- Insulated Listening: Avoiding certain topics.
- Selective Listening: Only paying attention to what one is interested in while ignoring and avoiding the rest of the information given.
- Stage-Hogging: Not really caring for what others have to say: only worried about yourself.
- Could also be considered fake or false listening.

=== False representations ===
Auditory processing disorder is when a person "is perfectly aware of sounds" yet their brain abnormally deciphers the sounds. This could easily be confused with pseudo-listening because it effects a listeners' reading comprehension. The two differ because auditory processing disorder uncontrollable and unintentional, while pseudolistening is typically done purposely.
