= Listen =

Listen may refer to:

- The action of listening
- Central auditory system listening is how the brain processes what you hear
- Listening behaviour types in human communication

== Computing ==
- LISTEN, a TCP connection state on the server side indicating a port waiting for new client connections
  - Listen server, a type of game server
  - listen(), a function provided by the Berkeley sockets API
- Project LISTEN, developing reading-tutorial software using speech recognition

== Music ==
=== Albums ===
- Listen (C21 album), 2004
- Listen (Christy Moore album), 2009
- Listen (Cindy Morgan album), 1996
- Listen (David Guetta album), 2014
- Listen (Doug Raney album), 1981
- Listen (Emanuel and the Fear album), 2010
- Listen (A Flock of Seagulls album), 1983
- Listen (Jordan Rudess album), 1993
- Listen (The Kooks album), 2014
- Listen (Paul Rogers album), 2002
- Listen (Tim Bowman Jr. album), 2016
- Listen (TQ album), 2004
- Listen (EP), by Stonefree, 2004
- Listen: The Very Best Of, by Herbs, 2002
- Listen: The Very Best of Jenny Morris, 2004
- Listennn... the Album, by DJ Khaled, 2006
- Listen, by Bondy Chiu
- Listen, by The Chordettes
- Listen, by Michelle Tumes
- Listen!, by Barbee Boys

=== Songs ===
- "Listen" (Beyoncé song), 2007
- "Listen" (Collective Soul song), 1997
- "Listen" (David Guetta song), 2014
- "Listen!!!", by Talib Kweli
- "Listen", by Bic Runga from Birds
- "Listen", by Chad Brownlee from Love Me or Leave Me
- "Listen", by Chicago from The Chicago Transit Authority
- "Listen", by The Clash from Capital Radio One
- "Listen", by Haley Reinhart from Better
- "Listen", by Julian Lennon from Help Yourself
- "Listen", by One Ok Rock, featuring Avril Lavigne, from Ambitions
- "Listen", by Tears For Fears from Songs from the Big Chair
- "Listen", by Toad The Wet Sprocket from Dulcinea

== Other uses ==
- Listen (2012 film), a 2012 film
- Listen (2020 film), a 2020 film
- Listen, a 2015 film featuring Micah Hauptman
- "Listen" (Doctor Who), a 2014 episode of Doctor Who
- Listen, a brand name of estradiol enanthate/algestone acetophenide, a form of birth control
- Listen (horse) (foaled 2005), Irish racehorse

== See also ==
- Listener (disambiguation)
- Listening (disambiguation)
