= All That I Want (C21 song) =

Single by C21

from the album Listen
- Released: 4 March 2004
- Genre: Pop
- Length: 3:45 (Radio Edit); 3:56 (Club Mix); 3:57 (Single Version)
- Label: Capitol / EMI
- Songwriters: Remee; Søren Bregendal Sørensen

C21 singles chronology
"One Night In Bangkok" (2003)	"All That I Want" (2004)	"Tell Me Why It Ain't Easy" (2004)

Music video
- "All That I Want" on YouTube

"All That I Want" is a single by the Danish boy band C21, released in March 2004 on the EMI label from their second album Listen (2004). It is a pop song that was written by Remee and Søren Bregendal Sørensen.

It peaked at #6 on the Danish Singles Chart and spent 18 weeks on the chart.

The song was the most successful single from the album. It also received a nomination for Danish Hit of the Year at the Nordic Music Awards and reached #2 on Tjeklisten, a radio chart broadcast on DR P3.

== Track listings ==
=== CD single (Copy Protected) ===
No.	Title	Writer(s)	Length
1.	"All That I Want" (Radio Edit)	Remee; Søren Bregendal Sørensen	3:45
2.	"All That I Want" (Club Version)	Remee; Søren Bregendal Sørensen	3:56

=== Promotional CD single ===
No.	Title	Writer(s)	Length
1.	"All That I Want"	Remee; Søren Bregendal Sørensen	3:57

== Charts ==
Chart (2004)	Peak position
Danish Singles Chart	6
