= One Night in Bangkok =

1984 single by Murray Head

Single by Murray Head

from the album Chess
- B-side: "Merano"
- Released: October 1984
- Genre: New wave; hip-hop; pop; synth-pop
- Length: 3:56 (promo 45 version); 4:06 (single version); 5:00 (album version); 5:38 (12" version)
- Label: RCA Victor
- Composers: Benny Andersson; Björn Ulvaeus
- Lyricists: Tim Rice; Björn Ulvaeus
- Producers: Benny Andersson; Björn Ulvaeus; Tim Rice

Murray Head singles chronology
"Maman" (1982)	"One Night in Bangkok" (1984)	"When You're in Love" (1984)

Music video
- "One Night in Bangkok" on YouTube

"One Night in Bangkok" is a song from the concept album and subsequent musical Chess by Tim Rice, Benny Andersson, and Björn Ulvaeus. English actor and singer Murray Head raps the verses, while the chorus is sung by Anders Glenmark, a Swedish singer, songwriter, and producer.

The release topped the charts in many countries, including South Africa, the Netherlands, West Germany, Switzerland, Denmark, and Australia. It peaked at No. 3 in both Canada and the United States in May 1985 and at No. 12 in the United Kingdom.

== Lyrics and music ==
Whereas the choruses extol Bangkok's reputation and exciting atmosphere, the American's verses ridicule the city, describing its attractions—the red-light districts, Chao Phraya River ("muddy old river"), Wat Pho ("reclining Buddha")—as less interesting to him than a game of chess. These sarcastic denunciations led to Thailand's Mass Communications Organisation issuing a ban on the song in 1985, stating its lyrics "cause misunderstanding about Thai society and show disrespect towards Buddhism".

== Track listings ==
7-inch single

1. "One Night in Bangkok" – 3:54
2. "Merano" by the London Symphony Orchestra and the Ambrosian Singers – 7:08

12-inch maxi

1. "One Night in Bangkok" – 5:38
2. "Merano" by the London Symphony Orchestra and the Ambrosian Singers – 7:08

== Charts ==
=== Weekly charts ===
Chart (1984–1985)	Peak position
Australia (Kent Music Report)	1
Austria (Ö3 Austria Top 40)	2
Belgium (Ultratop 50 Flanders)	1
Canada Retail Singles (The Record)	1
Canada Top Singles (RPM)	3
Canada Adult Contemporary (RPM)	1
Europe (European Airplay Top 50)	1
Europe (Eurochart Hot 100)	1
Finland (Suomen virallinen lista)	1
France (SNEP)	2
Ireland (IRMA)	7
Netherlands (Dutch Top 40)	2
Netherlands (Single Top 100)	1
New Zealand (Recorded Music NZ)	2
Norway (VG-lista)	3
South Africa (Springbok Radio)	1
Spain (AFYVE)	1
Sweden (Sverigetopplistan)	3
Switzerland (Schweizer Hitparade)	1
UK Singles (Official Charts)	12
US Billboard Hot 100	3
US Billboard 12-inch Singles Sales	8
US Billboard Adult Contemporary	35
US Billboard Dance/Disco Club Play	5
US Billboard Hot Black Singles	89
US Cash Box	4
West Germany (GfK)	1

=== Year-end charts ===
Chart (1985)	Position
Australia (Kent Music Report)	15
Austria (Ö3 Austria Top 40)	13
Belgium (Ultratop 50 Flanders)	12
Canada Top Singles (RPM)	17
France (SNEP)	25
Netherlands (Dutch Top 40)	33
Netherlands (Single Top 100)	29
New Zealand (RIANZ)	12
South Africa (Springbok Radio)	2
Switzerland (Schweizer Hitparade)	8
US Billboard Hot 100	54
US Cash Box	42
West Germany (Media Control)	7

== Certifications ==
Region	Certification	Certified units/sales
Canada (Music Canada)	Platinum	100,000^{^}
France (SNEP)	Silver	250,000^{*}
Germany (BVMI)	Gold	500,000^{^}
New Zealand (RMNZ)	Gold	15,000^{‡}
^{*} Sales figures based on certification alone.^{^} Shipments figures based on certification alone.^{‡} Sales+streaming figures based on certification alone.

== Robey version ==
While Head's "Bangkok" was just starting to climb the Billboard Hot 100, Canadian singer and actress Robey hit the charts with her version. It spent three weeks on the Hot 100 in March 1985, peaking at No. 77. Robey's version fared better on the Billboard Hot Dance Club Play chart, peaking at No. 9.

=== Charts ===
Chart (1985)	Peak position
US Billboard Hot 100	77
US Billboard Hot Dance Club Play	9
US Billboard Hot Dance Music/Maxi-Singles Sales	45
US Cash Box	75

== C21 version ==
"One Night In Bangkok"

Single by C21

from the album C21
- Released: October 2003
- Recorded: 2002
- Genre: Pop
- Length: 3:18
- Label: Medley / EMI
- Composers: Benny Andersson; Björn Ulvaeus
- Lyricists: Tim Rice; Björn Ulvaeus

C21 singles chronology
"She Cries" (2003)	"One Night In Bangkok" (2003)	"All That I Want" (2004)

Alternate cover
- Cover artwork for the Danish release

The Danish boy band C21 released their version in October 2003 as the fourth and final single from their debut album C21.

It reached No. 11 in Denmark. and spent four weeks on the chart.

=== Release ===
The single was released in multiple editions, with the European release issued by EMI featuring different cover artwork from the Danish edition released by Parlophone Music Denmark.

=== Tracklisting ===
No.	Title	Length
1.	"One Night In Bangkok" (Main Radio Version)	3:18
2.	"One Night In Bangkok" (Bangkok Radio Version)	3:17
3.	"One Night In Bangkok" (Acoustic Version)	2:03
4.	"One Night In Bangkok" (Peter Millward Remix)	5:23

=== Charts ===
Chart (2003)	Peak position
Denmark (Tracklisten)	11

== Vinylshakerz version ==
"One Night in Bangkok"

Single by Vinylshakerz

from the album Very Superior
- Released: 2005
- Length: 3:28 (radio edit); 5:20 (extended version)
- Label: Kontor
- Songwriters: Benny Andersson; Björn Ulvaeus (composers); Tim Rice; Björn Ulvaeus; (lyricists)
- Producers: Mike Griesheimer; Thomas Detert

Vinylshakerz singles chronology
"One Night in Bangkok" (2005)	"Tekkno Trash (Pay No Cash)" (2005)

Audio
- "One Night in Bangkok" on YouTube

In 2005, the German group Vinylshakerz covered the song. It was released in 2005 as the lead single from their debut studio album Very Superior, reaching number 6 in Finland and charting in several other European countries.

=== Charts ===
Chart (2005)	Peak position
Austria (Ö3 Austria Top 40)	41
Belgium (Ultratip Bubbling Under Flanders)	8
Belgium (Ultratip Bubbling Under Wallonia)	14
Finland (Suomen virallinen lista)	6
Germany (GfK)	26
Netherlands (Single Top 100)	53
Switzerland (Schweizer Hitparade)	87

== See also ==
- List of number-one singles in Australia during the 1980s
- List of European number-one hits of 1985
- List of number-one hits of 1985 (Germany)
- List of number-one singles of the 1980s (Switzerland)
