= Later Bitches =

Single by the Prince Karma
- Released: 30 March 2018
- Genre: Dance
- Length: 4:07
- Label: Panik; Happy; Ultra; Universal
- Composer: The Prince Karma

The Prince Karma singles chronology
"Later Bitches" (2018)	"No More" (2019)

"Later Bitches" is the debut single by Greek music producer the Prince Karma. Solely composed by him, the song was released for digital download and streaming on 30 March 2018 by Panik Entertainment Group. In May 2018, the Prince Karma signed a record deal with Ultra Records, which was one of the labels to distribute the song internationally. The oriental and Balkan-influenced dance track contains spoken vocals and lyrics that address nightlife in a self-ironic manner. Music critics gave positive reviews of the song upon release, praising its catchiness and commercial appeal.

Commercially, the song reached number one in the Commonwealth of Independent States (CIS) and Russia, as well as number 10 in Romania. It also notably charted at numbers 17 and 36 in France and Germany, where Syndicat National de l'Édition Phonographique (SNEP) and Bundesverband Musikindustrie (BVMI) awarded it gold certifications, respectively. To promote "Later Bitches", a music video was uploaded to YouTube on 28 September 2018, depicting people dancing in 80s-inspired club scenes. The Prince Karma also played the song live at multiple gigs, including at the 2019 NRJ DJ Awards, where it received a nomination in the Best Club Track category.

== Background and composition ==
According to the Prince Karma's Spotify biography, he is of Greek origin. However, press articles have reported him being Turkish or Dominican among others; he addressed this discussion in a July 2019 interview with El Universal: "They have told me that I am from Puerto Rico, on the networks they say that I am Turkish, others that I am from the Dominican Republic, they have told me that I am from so many countries and I feel good." Prior to releasing his debut single "Later Bitches" and signing a record deal with Ultra Records in May 2018, the Prince Karma frequently had disc jockey jobs in his youth. An editor of Radio Eska's website noted his anonymity, pointing out in September 2018 there was little information about him online and that his Facebook profile had under 200 followers. Katrin Elsner of 1LIVE considers the Prince Karma's preference for the pink colour to act as his "trademark", with his Instagram account being "reminiscent of a huge pile of cotton candy - everything is pink".

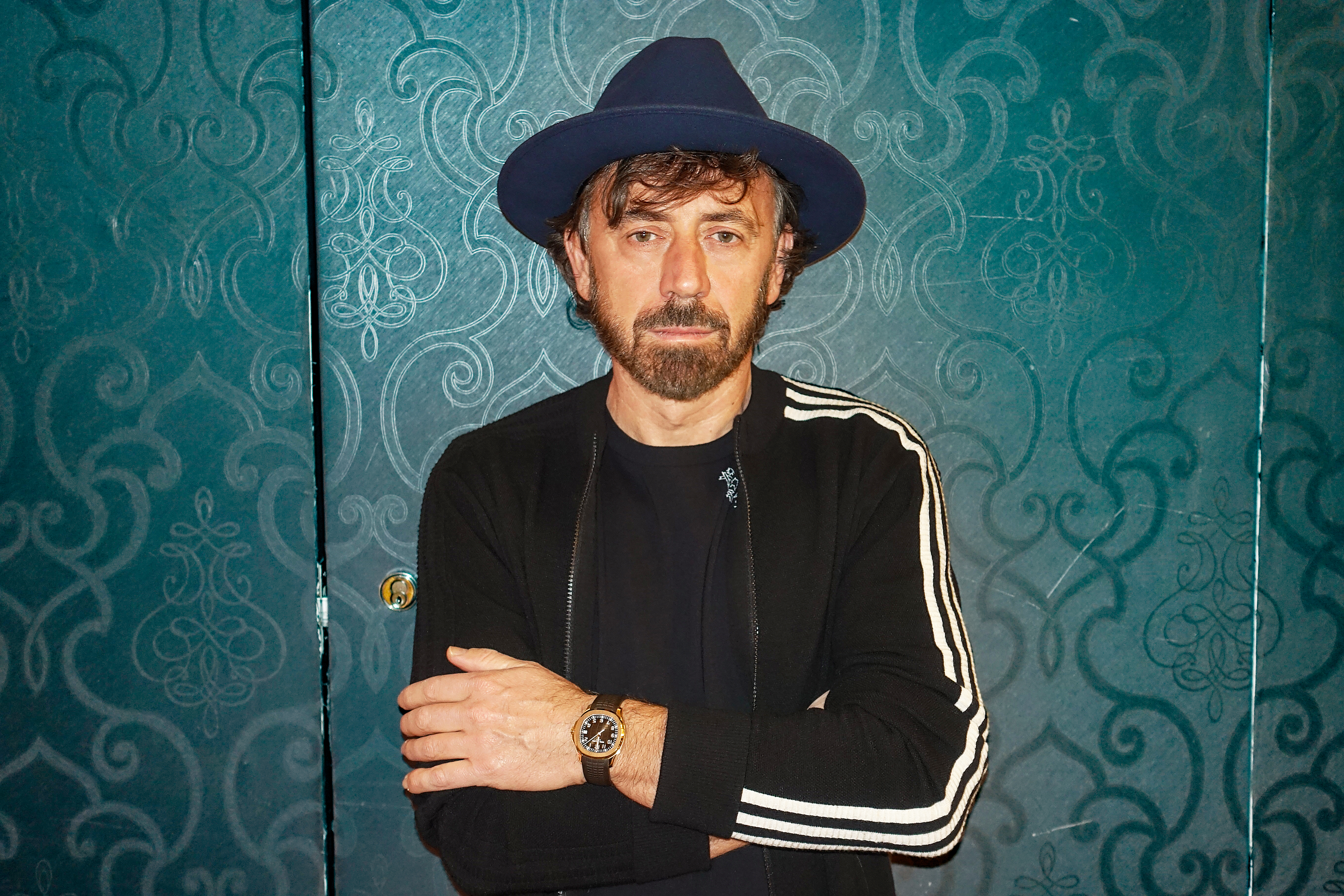
Italian disc jockey Benny Benassi was involved in the production of a remix of the song.

"Later Bitches" was first released for digital download and streaming on 30 March 2018 in Greece and Cyprus by Panik Entertainment Group. Subsequently, it was made available in various other countries, including the United States and United Kingdom, on 25 May 2018 through Ultra Records; in Turkey, the track's release was handled by Yeni Dünya Müzik on the same date. Happy Music distributed "Later Bitches" in France on 15 June 2018, while Ultra and Kontor Records jointly released the song in Germany on 9 November. On 1 March 2019, "Later Bitches" was also made available in Australia by Central Station Records. Several remixes were issued to promote the song. While one produced by Benny Benassi, Mazzz and Constantin was made available on 16 November 2018, four others were released as part of a remixes EP on 31 May 2019.

"Later Bitches" was composed solely by the Prince Karma. Musically, it is a dance track that encompasses oriental and Balkan influences. It is layered with spoken lyrics―including "What the hell do you mean I have to wait in line / This is complete and total bullshit / If I show you my tits, will you let me in?"―which detail nightlife in a self-ironic manner.

== Reception ==
Music critics gave positive reviews of the song upon its release. Elsner praised the track's catchy melody, whilst an editor of Songtexte.com wrote it "clearly stands out from the crowd and immediately lures you onto the dance floor". Düsseldorf Tonight's Daniel Hecht likened "Later Bitches" to the Hugel remix of El Profesor's "Bella ciao" (2018) and predicted that it "has what it takes to climb into the top 10" of the German charts. For the staff of Radio Eska, the song was a "contender for hit of the year". An editor of NordNews labelled "Later Bitches" as "cheeky, border-crossing" and "provocative". At the 2019 French NRJ DJ Awards, the song was nominated in the Best Club Track category, whilst the Prince Karma received a nomination for Revelation of the Year.

One month after its release, the song was trending on Shazam worldwide. "Later Bitches" first achieved success in the Commonwealth of Independent States (CIS), Russia and Ukraine in the September and October 2018, where it reached numbers one, one and 13, respectively, on the territories' TopHit radio airplay rankings. In November 2018, the song also peaked at number 21 on the Polish Airplay Chart and at number 24 on the Wallonian Ultratop 50 chart. It eventually found success in further countries in the first half of 2019, climbing to number 10 in Romania, as well as reaching number 36 in Germany and number 17 in France. For sales exceeding 200,000 and 100,000 copies, "Later Bitches" was awarded gold certifications in the latter two territories by Bundesverband Musikindustrie (BVMI) and Syndicat National de l'Édition Phonographique (SNEP), respectively.

== Promotion and other usage ==
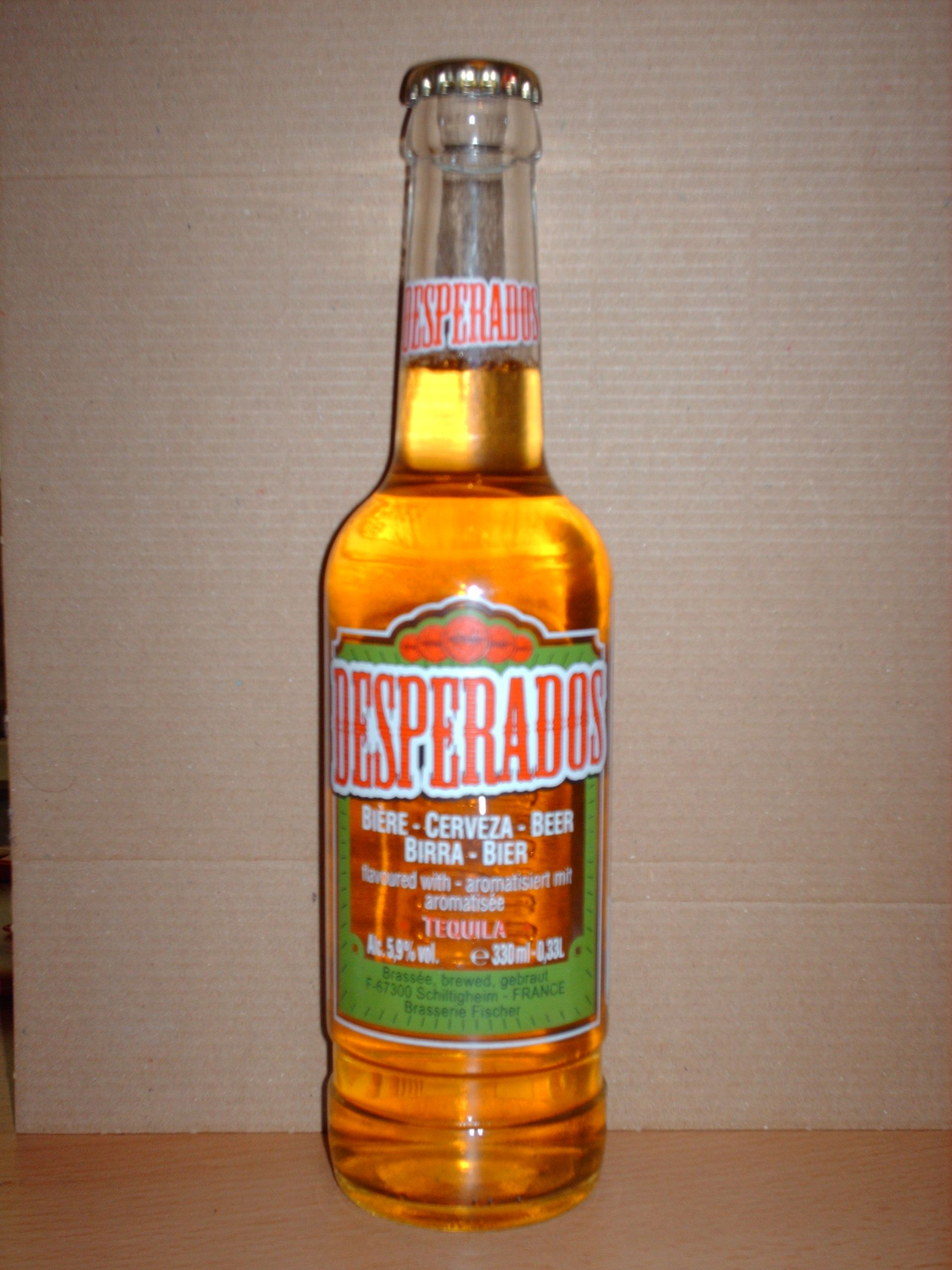
"Later Bitches" was used in a Desperados commercial in 2020.

A lyric video for "Later Bitches" was uploaded to Down2Earth Music Group's YouTube channel on 3 April 2018, featuring old-looking lo-fi footage of people partying. The visuals, belonging to the Stratus Dance Club channel, were edited by Truetone. The song's official music video was later released by Ultra Records on 28 September 2018. It features similar 80s-inspired club scenes and people dressed accordingly, including some wearing mullet hairstyles.

For further promotion, the Prince Karma played the song at the 2018 Greek MAD Video Music Awards in front of an audience of 5,000, making it his live debut. The ceremony also used "Later Bitches" as its theme song. The track was also performed at the 2019 NRJ DJ Awards and the 2019 Energy SummerOpening-Party in Germany. "Later Bitches" was included on the German compilation album Bravo Hits 104, released on 15 February 2019. Furthermore, the song was used in a Desperados advertising campaign in 2020.

== Track listing ==
- Official versions (Note: This acts as a summary of all digital versions of the single.)
1. "Later Bitches" — 4:07
2. "Later Bitches" (Benny Benassi vs. Mazzz & Constantin Remix) — 3:33
3. "Later Bitches" (Billy Kenny Remix) — 5:03
4. "Later Bitches" (Danny Dove Re – Rub) — 4:05
5. "Later Bitches" (Dnf Remix) — 3:29
6. "Later Bitches" (Sebastian Perez Remix) — 4:40

== Charts ==
=== Weekly charts ===
Weekly chart performance for "Later Bitches"
Chart (2018–2019)	Peak position
Austria (Ö3 Austria Top 40)	54
Belarus Airplay (Eurofest)	8
Belgium (Ultratip Bubbling Under Flanders)	42
Belgium (Ultratop 50 Wallonia)	24
CIS Airplay (TopHit)	1
France (SNEP)	17
Germany (GfK)	36
Germany Airplay (BVMI)	31
Poland Airplay (ZPAV)	21
Poland (Polish Airplay TV)	1
Romania (Airplay 100)	10
Romania Airplay (Media Forest)	2
Russia Airplay (TopHit)	1
Switzerland (Media Control Romandy)	13
Ukraine Airplay (TopHit)	13

=== Monthly charts ===
Monthly chart performance for "Later Bitches"
Chart (2018)	Peak position
CIS (TopHit)	2
Russia Airplay (TopHit)	1
Ukraine Airplay (TopHit)	23

=== Year-end charts ===
Year-end chart performance for "Later Bitches"
Chart (2018)	Position
CIS (TopHit)	54
Russia Airplay (TopHit)	47
Chart (2019)	Position
CIS (TopHit)	127
France (SNEP)	106
Germany (Official German Charts)	68
Romania (Airplay 100)	37
Russia Airplay (TopHit)	159

== Certifications ==
Certifications and sales for "Later Bitches"
Region	Certification	Certified units/sales
Denmark (IFPI Danmark)	Gold	45,000^{‡}
France (SNEP)	Gold	100,000^{‡}
Germany (BVMI)	Gold	200,000^{‡}
Poland (ZPAV)	Platinum	50,000^{‡}
^{‡} Sales+streaming figures based on certification alone.

== Release history ==
Release dates and formats for "Later Bitches"
Country	Date	Format(s)	Label	Ref.
Greece	30 March 2018	Digital download; streaming	Panik	
Cyprus	30 March 2018	Digital download; streaming	Panik	
Turkey	25 May 2018	Digital download; streaming	Yeni Dünya	
United States	25 May 2018	Digital download; streaming	Ultra	
United Kingdom	25 May 2018	Digital download; streaming	Ultra	
Russia	25 May 2018	Digital download; streaming	Ultra	
Italy	25 May 2018	Digital download; streaming	Ultra	
Spain	25 May 2018	Digital download; streaming	Ultra	
France	15 June 2018	Digital download; streaming	Happy	
Germany	9 November 2018	Digital download; streaming	Ultra; Kontor	
Australia	1 March 2019	Digital download; streaming	Central Station	
