= Listening (disambiguation) =

Listening is the conscious processing of the auditory stimuli that have been perceived through hearing.

Listening or The Listening may also refer to:

== Film ==
- Listening (film), a 2003 British short film by Kenneth Branagh
- The Listening (film), a 2006 Italian film

== Music ==
- Listening (band), an American psychedelic rock band from Boston
- The Listening (band), an American rock band from Washington state
- The Listening (Lights album) or the title song, 2009
- The Listening (Little Brother album) or the title song, 2003
- "Listening" (song), by Pseudo Echo, 1983
- "Listening", a song written by Irving Berlin
- "Listening", a song by Pet Shop Boys, a B-side of the single "Memory of the Future"
- "Listening", a song by the Used from In Love and Death
- "The Listening", a song by Eyes Set to Kill from Broken Frames

== See also ==
- Listen (disambiguation)
- Listener (disambiguation)
