= C21 (album) =

Studio album by C21
- Released: 22 May 2003
- Recorded: 2002
- Genre: Pop
- Label: Medley/EMI

C21 chronology
C21 (2003)	Listen (2004)

Singles from C21
- 1. "Stuck In My Heart" Released: September 2002; 2. "You Are The One" Released: January 2003; 3. "She Cries" Released: April 2003; 4. "One Night In Bangkok" Released: August 2003

C21 is the debut album from the Danish boy band C21, released on 22 May 2003 through Medley and EMI.

The album peaked at #9 on the Danish Albums Chart and was certified gold by IFPI Denmark for sales in excess of 10,000 copies.

It stayed on the Danish Albums Chart for 24 weeks.

It produced four singles: "Stuck In My Heart", "You Are the One", "She Cries" and "One Night In Bangkok".

The album became the most successful debut album by a Danish boy band in Denmark and helped establish the group internationally, particularly in Southeast Asia.

== Singles ==
The album was preceded by the lead single "Stuck In My Heart", which peaked at #9 on the Danish Singles Chart and spent 14 weeks on the chart.

The second major single "You Are the One" peaked at #3 and spent 4 weeks on the chart.

The third single "She Cries", reached #7 and remained on the chart for 11 weeks.

A later edition of the album included the bonus track "One Night In Bangkok", a cover of the 1984 song by Murray Head, which was released as the album's fourth single and achieved particular popularity in Southeast Asia, especially Thailand. It peaked at #11 and spent 4 weeks on the Danish Singles Chart.

== Track listing ==
No.	Title	Writer(s)	Length
1.	"Stuck In My Heart"	Claus Hasfeldt, Lars Quang	3:44
2.	"Be with You Again"	Lars Quang, Søren Bregendal Sørensen	3:39
3.	"You Are The One"	Martin Michael Larsson, A. Fromm, Lars Halvor Jensen	3:50
4.	"She Cries"	David Pepke, Søren Bregendal Sørensen, Lars Quang, Esben Duus	3:11
5.	"Don't Wanna Lose You"	Lars Quang, Søren Bregendal Sørensen	3:58
6.	"Cuts Deep Inside"	Ziggy, Eikemo, Crow, Lars Quang	3:47
7.	"Learning by Living"	Anders Bergström, Mikael Andersson	3:24
8.	"You Just Wait and See"	Lars Quang, Søren Bregendal Sørensen	3:49
9.	"Hanging on a String"	D. James, Lars Quang	4:00
10.	"Standing on the Edge"	Søren Bregendal Sørensen, Lars Quang	3:30
11.	"Deep Down"	Alan Ross, Lee Brennan, Dave James	3:42
12.	"Could You Ever"	Claus Hasfeldt, Lars Quang, Søren Bregendal Sørensen, David Pepke, Esben Duus	3:39
13.	"Say It Again"	Mauro Scocco	3:36
14.	"Love Will Never Lie"	Lars Quang, Søren Bregendal Sørensen	3:24
15.	"Stuck In My Heart (Acoustic Version)"	Claus Hasfeldt, Lars Quang	3:45
16.	"One Night In Bangkok"	B. Andersson, B. Ulvaeus, T. Rice	3:18
17.	"One Night In Bangkok (Remix)"	B. Andersson, B. Ulvaeus, T. Rice	5:22

== Charts ==
Chart (2003)	Peak position
Danish Albums Chart	9
