= Workplace listening =

Active listening in a professional environment

Workplace listening is a type of active listening that is generally employed in a professional environment. Listening skills are imperative for career success, organizational effectiveness, and worker satisfaction. Workplace listening includes understanding the listening process (i.e. perception, interpretation, evaluation, and action) and its barriers that hamper the flow of that process. Like other skills, there are specific techniques for improving workplace listening effectiveness. Moreover, it is imperative to become aware of the role of nonverbal communication in communicating in the workplace, as understanding messages wholly entails more than simple verbal messages.

== See also ==
- Active listening – Technique of both listening to what is said and replying with an accurate summary
- Informational listening – Listening focused on understanding a message
- Nonverbal communication – Interpersonal communication through wordless (mostly visual) cues
- Reflective listening – Communication strategy
- Appreciative listening – Listening behaviour targeting media for enjoyment
