= Kontor Records =

German music label

- Type: Private
- Industry: Music
- Genre: Electronic dance music
- Founded: 1996; 30 years ago Hamburg, Germany
- Founder: Jens Thele
- Headquarters: Hamburg, Germany
- Area served: Worldwide
- Owner: Edel SE & Co. KGaA (66.79%)
- Divisions: Club Tools; Do It Yourself Entertainment; Kontor New Media; Musicismusic; Sheffield Tunes; Panet Punk Music; Zooland Music
- Website: kontorrecords.de

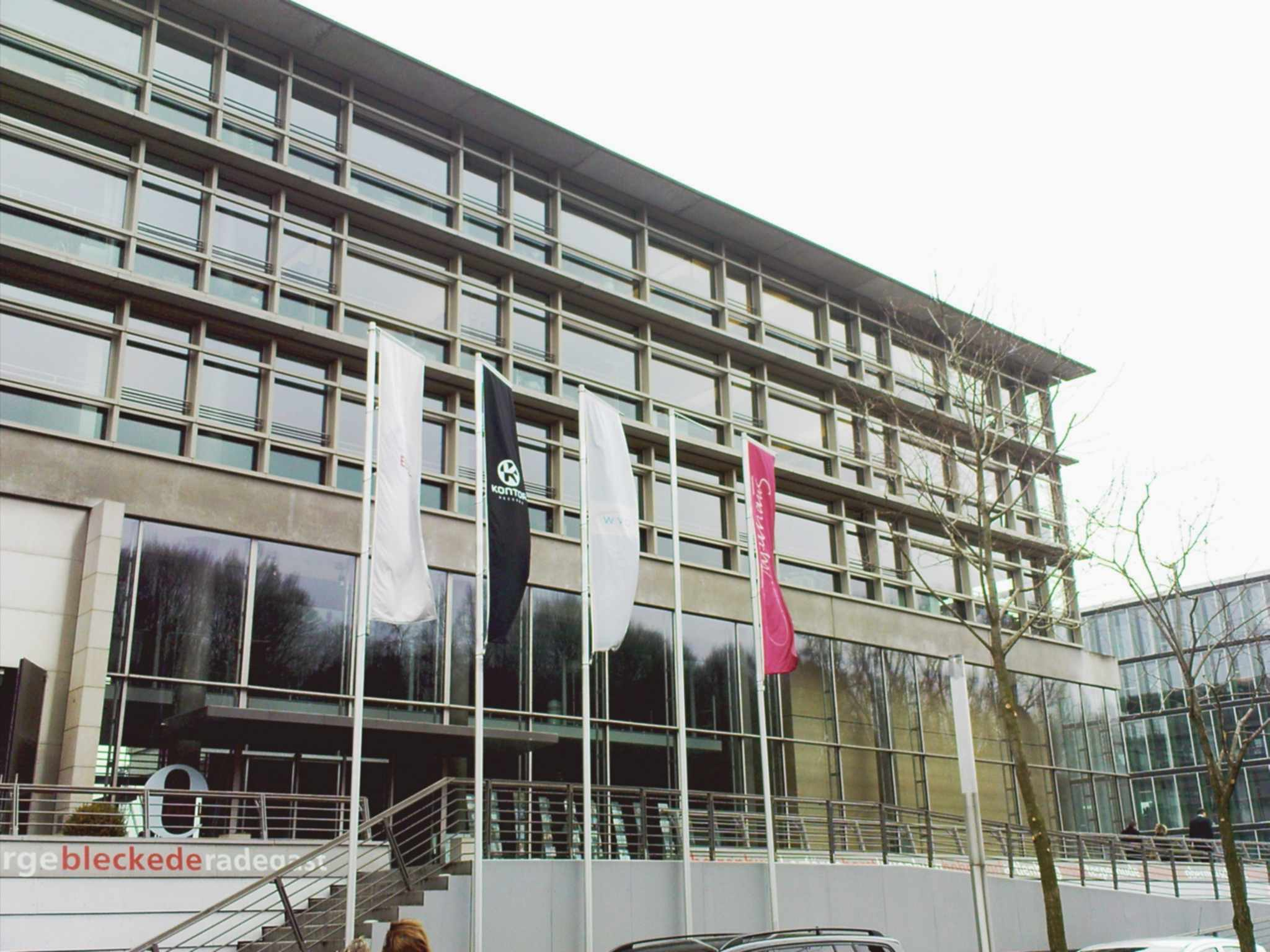
Headquarters of Kontor Records and Edel AG at Neumühlen, Hamburg

Kontor Records is an independent record label based in Hamburg, Germany. The label's artist roster includes ATB, Tiësto, Armin van Buuren and Scooter. Jens Thele is the head manager of Kontor and is also the manager of Scooter.

Edel SE & Co. KGaA is the largest shareholder of the company and distributes its releases in German-speaking Europe. Outside Germany, Austria and Switzerland, Kontor Records have arranged multiple distribution deals with third-party labels.

== History ==
Founded in 1996, the label originated as a club night that Jens Thele organised in Hamburg's central business district. Kontor was rapidly established as a successful musical project for local DJs and producers, and this was followed by interest from international artists. Thele has said, "We place great importance on long-term artist relationships and development, always looking to create album projects". In 2000 51% of the company was acquired by the German media company Edel AG, with Thele and other shareholders retaining operative roles in the company. As of 2004, the company's office overlooks the Hamburg dockland area. Edel is still the largest shareholder in Kontor Records and currently owns 66.79% of shares.

The label launched the Kontor.TV YouTube channel in 2006 and music videos, playlists and preview mixes of new releases are uploaded onto the channel. As of February 2017, 4.5 million users are subscribed to Kontor.TV. In early 2013, the label entered into a partnership with the Spotify online music streaming service and Kontor.FM was launched in March 2013.

In June 2013, Kontor garnered attention for a novel promotional campaign for the new song from artist Boris Dlugosch. The recipient of the music unfolds a device called The Office Turntable that serves as a 2D Technics turntable on which Dlugosch's vinyl single can be heard. The vinyl is neon orange-colored and most types of smartphones are used to scan an activating QR code on the fold-out device. Label staff explained to Contagious Magazine's YouTube channel that they were motivated by creative directors who often ignore the music promotions they are sent.

== Compilation brands ==
Kontor's compilation brands include Kontor Top Of The Clubs and Kontor House of House.

== Affiliate and partner labels ==
The Sheffield Tunes imprint is a Kontor affiliate label that released the music of Scooter. Scooter's members, H. P. Baxxter and Rick J. Jordan, are company directors of Kontor Records. As of October 2013, Kontor Records is one of the numerous partners listed on the CR2 Records website, a London, United Kingdom (UK) electronic music label founded by musician Mark Brown (also known by the moniker "MYNC").

In June 2020, Kontor acquired the German rock label Arising Empire.

== Artists ==
- DJ Antoine
- ATB
- Armin van Buuren
- Aquagen
- Cascada
- Code Red
- Blank & Jones
- David Carson
- DJ Dean
- Dimitri Vegas & Like Mike
- KCB
- The Disco Boys
- EDX
- Fedde Le Grand
- Hardwell
- Mike Candys
- ItaloBrothers
- Klingande
- Klubbingman
- Alexander Marcus
- Nightcrawlers
- R.I.O.
- DJ Sammy
- Scooter
- Giulia Siegel
- Special D.
- Spiller
- Sunset Strippers
- Alexandra Stan
- Lexy & K-Paul
- Martin Tungevaag
- Vinylshakerz
- Jan Wayne
- Rania Zeriri
- Tiësto
- W&W
