= She Cries =

Single by C21

from the album C21
- Released: April 2003
- Genre: Pop
- Length: 3:11
- Label: EMI
- Songwriters: David Pepke; Søren Bregendal Sørensen; Lars Quang; Esben Duus

C21 singles chronology
"You Are the One" (2003)	"She Cries" (2003)	"One Night In Bangkok" (2003)

Music video
- "She Cries" on YouTube

"She Cries" is the third major single by the Danish boy band C21, released in 2003 on the EMI label from their debut studio album, C21 (2003). It is a pop song that was written by David Pepke, Søren Bregendal Sørensen, Lars Quang and Esben Duus.

It peaked at #7 on the Danish Singles Chart and spent 11 weeks on the chart.

== Track listing ==
No.	Title	Length
1.	"She Cries"	3:11

== Charts ==
Chart (2003)	Peak position
Danish Singles Chart	7
