= Stuck in My Heart =

"Stuck In My Heart"

Single by C21

from the album C21
- Released: September 2002
- Genre: Pop
- Length: 3:44
- Label: EMI
- Songwriters: Claus Hasfeldt; Lars Nielsen

C21 singles chronology
"Stuck In My Heart" (2002)	"You Are the One" (2003)

Music video
- "Stuck In My Heart" on YouTube

"Stuck In My Heart" is the debut single by the Danish boy band C21, released in 2002 on the EMI label. It was the lead single as well as the opening track from their debut studio album, C21 (2003). It is a pop song that was written by Claus Hasfeldt and Lars Nielsen.

== Track listing ==
No.	Title	Writer(s)	Length
1.	"Stuck In My Heart" (Radio Version)	Claus Hasfeldt; Lars Nielsen	3:44
2.	"Stuck In My Heart" (Acoustic Version)	Claus Hasfeldt; Lars Nielsen	3:43
3.	"Stuck In My Heart" (Instrumental Version)	Claus Hasfeldt; Lars Nielsen	3:44
4.	"You Just Wait and See" (bonus track)	Lars Nielsen; Søren Bregendal	3:50

== Charts ==
Chart (2002)	Peak position
Denmark (Tracklisten)	9
