= Listener =

Listener(s) or The Listener(s) may refer to:

== Literature ==
- The Listener (magazine), a 1929–1991 British weekly covering broadcast media
- New Zealand Listener, weekly magazine covering politics and culture
- The Listeners (novel), a 1972 novel by James Gunn
- The Listeners, a 1912 poetry collection, or the title poem, by Walter de la Mare
- The Listeners, a 1970 novel by Monica Dickens
- The Listeners, a 2021 novel by Jordan Tannahill
- Ashema the Listener, a Marvel Comics character

== Music ==
- Listener (band), an American spoken-word rock band
- The Listener (album), by Jeff Williams, 2013
- The Listeners (opera), a 2022 opera by Missy Mazzoli

== Television ==
- The Listener (TV series), a 2009–2014 Canadian fantasy drama series
- The Listeners (TV series), a 2024 British TV series
- Listeners, a 2020 Japanese anime series

== Other uses ==
- The Listener (film), a 2022 drama film starring Tessa Thompson
- Listener (computing) or event handler, in computer programming, a callback subroutine that handles inputs
- Listener, a prisoner in a UK jail trained by Samaritans to provide support to other prisoners

== See also ==
- Hearing (sense)
- Listen (disambiguation)
- Listening (disambiguation)
