= You Are the One (C21 song) =

"You Are The One"

Single by C21

from the album C21
- Released: January 2003
- Genre: Pop
- Length: 3:50 (Original Version)
- Label: EMI
- Songwriters: Martin Michael Larsson; A. Fromm; Lars Halvor Jensen

C21 singles chronology
| "Stuck In My Heart" (2002) | "You Are The One" (2003) | "She Cries" (2003) |

Music video
- "You Are The One" on YouTube

"You Are The One" is the second major single by the Danish boy band C21, released in January 2003 on the EMI label from their debut studio album, C21 (2003). It is a pop song that was written by Martin Michael Larsson, A. Fromm and Lars Halvor Jensen.

It peaked at #3 on the Danish Singles Chart and spent 4 weeks on the chart.

The song was originally released as a single in January 2003 and was later reissued by Parlophone Music Denmark on 27 June 2003.

== Track listing ==
| No. | Title | Writer(s) | Length |
|---|---|---|---|
| 1. | "You Are the One" (Original Version) | Martin Michael Larsson; A. Fromm; Lars Halvor Jensen | 3:50 |
| 2. | "You Are the One" (Shine & Static Radio Version) | Martin Michael Larsson; A. Fromm; Lars Halvor Jensen | 3:46 |
| 3. | "You Are the One" (Acoustic Version) | Martin Michael Larsson; A. Fromm; Lars Halvor Jensen | 3:50 |
| 4. | "You Are the One" (Shine & Static Extended Remix) | Martin Michael Larsson; A. Fromm; Lars Halvor Jensen | 5:14 |
| 5. | "You Are the One" (Instrumental Version) | Martin Michael Larsson; A. Fromm; Lars Halvor Jensen | 3:50 |

== Charts ==
| Chart (2002) | Peak position |
|---|---|
| Denmark (Tracklisten) | 3 |
