= C21 (group) =

Danish boy band

- C21 in 2003

Background information
- Origin: Denmark
- Genre: Pop
- Years active: 1998–2006; 2023–present
- Label: Capitol/EMI: Stay Pop Music
- Members: Søren Bregendal: David Pepke
- Past members: Esben Duus
- Website: https://www.wearec21.dk

C21 are a Danish pop boy band. In the early days, they consisted of three key members: Søren Bregendal (vocals, lyricist, producer and keyboards), Esben Duus (vocals, lyricist and guitar), and David Pepke (vocals, lyricist and guitar).

The band has sold more than 40,000 copies in their native country Denmark, and more than 250,000 copies in Asia. They had success in 14 countries in their peak time.

Following the departure of Esben Duus and the band's disbandment in 2006, C21 reunited in 2023 as a duo consisting of Søren Bregendal and David Pepke. Since their reunion, the group has released the EPs "Stay Pop Pt. 1" (2024), "Stay Pop Pt. 2" (2025), and "Then. Now. Always." (2026).

According to the band's official website, unofficial estimates place C21's sales in Southeast Asia at over 2.5 million copies. The website also states that the group developed a large fan base in Thailand, China, India, Malaysia and the Philippines and performed at MTV events in China and India, as well as at major concerts in Thailand.

== Career ==
=== Formation and early success (1998–2004) ===
The band was formed in 1998 when Danish music producer Lars Quang heard Søren Bregendal singing in the locker room after his son's football game. Quang invited Søren Bregendal to his studio to test his vocals. Søren brought his fellow school friend, Esben Duus to the studio. At a warm up gig at a birthday party, the two met fellow musician David Pepke and the trio was formed. C21 have only just begun profiling themselves on the music scene. Their self-titled debut album was released on 27 January 2003.

Their 2003 debut album C21 was the most successful Danish boy band debut album in Denmark. The first single, "Stuck In My Heart", was released on 16 September 2002 as the breakthrough single for the group and became popular in Southeast Asia (namely Thailand). Further singles included "You Are The One" and "She Cries". The fourth single, "One Night in Bangkok", was released on 29 September 2003. The song was originally done by Murray Head in 1984.

C21's second album, Listen, was released on 24 May 2004 and became the group's final studio album before their reunion in 2023.

The album spawned the singles "All That I Want" and "Tell Me Why It Ain't Easy", with "All That I Want" peaking at #6 on the Danish Singles Chart on 30 April 2004.

The album Listen reached number 22 on the Danish Albums Chart.

=== Hiatus, Solo Projects and One/Off Performance (2005–2022) ===
In March 2005, Esben Duus left the group due to professional and personal disagreements.

Bregendal and Pepke stated that Duus had never fully settled into life in the public eye, which contributed to his departure. The remaining members briefly continued as a duo and worked on material for a third studio album before announcing the disbandment of C21 in 2006.

Following the disbandment of C21, Søren Bregendal pursued a solo music and acting career.

In 2005, he made his acting debut in the family film Father of Four – Never Give Up! (2005) and reprised his role in the sequel Father of Four – In Style (2006). He also appeared in Christina Rosendahl's coming-of-age comedy-drama Supervoksen (2006).

In 2007, he released his debut solo album, Life Is Simple Not Easy, through Warner Music. The album spawned four singles: "Summer Sun", "Take the Fall", "Every Breath I Take", and "Electric Eyes".

In 2010, Pepke released his first solo album called "Tuesday Session". It was a concept album with seven tracks which were all written and recorded in one day. The album did not achieve a position on the Danish chart. In 2011, he released his first solo single, "Yellow Sign".

In 2010, Pepke released his first solo EP, Tuesday Session, through his independent label Roll Tape Records. Conceived as a concept project, the EP consisted of seven tracks that were written and recorded in a single day before being released the following day. According to Pepke, the project was intended as a reaction to what he viewed as the music industry's slow pace and reluctance to embrace new ideas. The EP did not chart in Denmark. In 2011, he released his debut solo single, "Yellow Sign".

In 2012, Bregendal joined another boyband, Lighthouse X. The group represented Denmark in the Eurovision Song Contest 2016 in Stockholm with the song "Soldiers Of Love", finishing 17th in the second semi-final. Lighthouse X disbanded in August 2016.

In 2013, it was announced that Bregendal was working on a Danish-language album titled Sorensen, which according to the plan was to contain collaborations with a number of DJs. However, the album was never released and the reason for this has not been announced.

In June 2014, the group reunited performing the hit songs "Stuck in My Heart", "All That I Want" and "You Just Wait and See" at Løven & Bastionen in Copenhagen. The occasion was the wedding of a close friend to Søren Bregendal.

In 2019, Danish newspaper B.T. interviewed Søren Bregendal and David Pepke about their lives following C21's breakup. During the interview, they revealed that they had discussed the possibility of reuniting the band in the future.

From 2021 to 2022, Bregendal appeared in seasons 2 and 3 of the Netflix television series Emily in Paris as Erik de Groot.

=== Reunion and Stay Pop EPs (2023–present) ===
On 30 August 2023, C21 (David and Søren) reunited after a 17-year hiatus.

In the years leading up to the reunion, the duo's music continued to have a significant fan base, particularly in Southeast Asia, where several of their songs from the early 2000’s continued to be streamed and shared on social media.

The duo maintains an official Instagram presence under the handle @wearec21.

They released the comeback single on 15 September, entitled "Tricks", the first song from their EP "Stay Pop Pt. 1", which included 6 other songs.

The full EP was eventually released on 19 April 2024. The EP marked a continuation of the group's pop sound, but with inspiration from modern productions. The release was followed up by new singles and promotion in both Denmark and abroad.

On 28 March 2025, C21 released the follow-up EP "Stay Pop Pt. 2", which served as a continuation of the comeback project. The album featured several new songs and was launched as the second part of the duo's Stay Pop series.

Later in 2025, the duo released a re-recorded version of their 2003 hit "Stuck in My Heart ", featuring Danish singer Anja Nissen, as the lead single from their EP "Then. Now. Always.".

They subsequently released the standalone Christmas single "Maybe This Christmas", their second Christmas-themed release following "Spirit of Christmas" in 2024.

In early 2026, C21 released "Secrets (Paradise Hotel Theme Song 26')", which served as the official theme song for the 2026 season of the Danish reality television series Paradise Hotel. The song was later included on the EP "Then. Now. Always.", released in 2026.

On 22 May 2026, C21 released the single "LYDLOS", their first Danish-language single following more than two decades of recording primarily in English. The release marked the band's first new material since the EP "Then. Now. Always."

On 6 November 2026, C21 released their second Danish-language single, "HJERTERUM", which has a duration of three minutes.

== Influences ==
During an Instagram Live session on Søren Bregendal's private profile in 2023, Bregendal was asked by a fan who C21 was inspired by in their younger days. Bregendal mentioned the British singer Gary Barlow as well as Barlow's group Take That.

== Members ==
=== Current members ===
- Søren Bregendal: Vocals, songwriting and piano (1998–2006; 2014 (one/off performance); 2023 – Present)
- David Pepke: Backing Vocals & Guitar (1998–2006; 2014 (one/off); 2023 – Present)

=== Past Members ===
- Esben Duus: Vocals, Songwriting & Guitar (1998–2005)

== Discography ==
=== Studio albums ===
Year	Album	Peak chart positions	Certifications
Year	Album	DEN	Certifications
2003	C21	9	IFPI: Gold
2004	Listen	22	

=== EPs ===
Year	EP	Peak chart positions	Certifications
Year	EP	DEN	Certifications
2024	Stay Pop Pt. 1	—	
2025	Stay Pop Pt. 2	—	
2026	Then. Now. Always.	—	

=== Singles ===
Year	Title	Album / EP	Chart positions
Year	Title	Album / EP	DEN
2002	"Stuck In My Heart"	C21	9
2003	"You Are The One"	C21	3
2003	"She Cries"	C21	7
2003	"One Night In Bangkok"	C21	11
2004	"All That I Want"	Listen	6
2004	"Tell Me Why It Ain't Easy"	Listen	—
2023	"Tricks"	Stay Pop Pt. 1	—
2023	"Here's To Life"	Stay Pop Pt. 1	—
2023	"One Of Us Is Lonely"	Stay Pop Pt. 1	—
2024	"Wrap Your Arms Around Me"	Stay Pop Pt. 2	—
2024	"Live A Lie"	Stay Pop Pt. 2	—
2024	"Spirit of Christmas"	Non-album single	—
2025	"Never Gone"	Stay Pop Pt. 2	—
2025	"Never Gone (Alternative Version)"	Non-album single	—
2025	"Rocky"	Stay Pop Pt. 2	—
2025	"Rocky (Alternative Version)"	Non-album single	—
2025	"Heart Race (Alternative Version)"	Non-album single	—
2025	"Against Them All (Alternative Version)"	Non-album single	—
2025	"Final Touch (Alternative Version)"	Non-album single	—
2025	"Stuck In My Heart" (featuring Anja Nissen)	Then. Now. Always.	—
2025	"Maybe This Christmas"	Non-album single	—
2025	"Secrets (Paradise Hotel Theme Song 26')"	Then. Now. Always.	—
2026	"LYDLOS"	Non-album single	—
2026	"HJERTERUM"	Non-album single	—
"—" denotes releases that did not chart.
