= Jan Wayne =

- Born: Jan Christiansen; January 1974 (age 51–52); Husum, West Germany
- Genres: Electronic dance music

Jan Wayne (German pronunciation: [ˌjan ˈvɛɪn] (born Jan Christiansen, January 1974, Husum, Schleswig-Holstein) is a German electronic dance music DJ and producer.

== Discography ==
=== Albums ===
- 2002 - Back Again
- 2003 - Gonna Move Ya

=== Singles ===
- 2001 - "Total Eclipse of the Heart" - UK #28 (in 2003)
- 2002 - "Because the Night" - UK #14
- 2002 - "Only You" (Cover of Yazoo's song)
- 2002 - "More Than a Feeling"
- 2003 - "Love Is a Soldier"
- 2003 - "1,2,3 (Keep the Spirit Alive)"
- 2004 - "Here I Am (Send Me an Angel)"
- 2005 - "Mad World"
- 2006 - "Time to Fly"
- 2006 - "All Over the World"
- 2007 - "Time Stood Still"
- 2007 - "I Touch Myself"
- 2007 - "She's Like the Wind"
- 2008 - "Numb" / "Numb Remixes" / "Numb - The New Mixes" - Jan Wayne vs. Raindropz!
- 2009 - "Wherever You Will Go" (Cover of The Calling's Song)
- 2010 - "L'Amour Toujours" (WEB) / Jan Wayne Presents Marco Lovei and DVZ
- 2011 - "Run To You"
- 2011 - "Bring Me To Life"
- 2012 - "Free Fallin"
