= Listen (C21 album) =

Studio album by C21
- Released: 24 May 2004
- Genre: Pop
- Label: Capitol/EMI

C21 chronology
C21 (2003)	Listen (2004)	Stay Pop Pt. 1 (2024)

Singles from Listen
- 1. "All That I Want" Released: 4 March 2004; 2. "Tell Me Why It Ain't Easy" Released: October 2004

Listen is the second album from the Danish boy band C21, released on 24 May 2004 through Capitol and EMI.

It is C21's final studio album before the band's reunion in 2023 and the last album to feature vocals from Esben Duus, who left the group in 2005.

The album spawned the singles "All That I Want" and "Tell Me Why It Ain't Easy", with the former reaching #6 on the Danish Singles Chart and becoming one of the most played songs on Danish radio in 2004.

"Tell Me Why It Ain't Easy" and "Don't Wanna Wait" also received airplay on Tjeklisten radio program, reaching #16 and #18 respectively.

The album peaked at #22 on the Danish Albums Chart and stayed on the chart for 5 weeks.

== Singles ==
"All That I Want" was the album's most successful single, peaking at #6 on the Danish Singles Chart. The song also received a nomination for Danish Hit of the Year at the Nordic Music Awards and reached #2 on Tjeklisten, a radio chart broadcast on DR P3.

The second single "Tell Me Why It Ain't Easy" was less successful and didn't chart on the Danish Singles Chart although it reached at #16 on Tjeklisten.

== Track listing ==
No.	Title	Writer(s)	Length
1.	"All That I Want"	Remee, Søren Bregendal Sørensen	3:52
2.	"Too Late"	Søren Bregendal Sørensen, Jascha Richter	3:13
3.	"Must Go On"	Lars Quang, Esben Duus	4:02
4.	"Déjà Vu"	Esben Duus, Lars Quang, David Pepke	3:17
5.	"When I Look In Your Eyes"	Søren Bregendal Sørensen, Lars Quang	4:07
6.	"Don't Wanna Wait"	Johannes Jørgensen, Søren Bregendal Sørensen, Lars Halvor Jensen, Martin Michael Larsson	3:17
7.	"Tell Me Why It Ain't Easy"	Lars Quang, Søren Bregendal Sørensen	4:14
8.	"When Your Love Is Too Far"	Lars Quang, Esben Duus	4:20
9.	"If You Could Be Anyone"	Lars Quang, Søren Bregendal Sørensen	3:37
10.	"Don't Break It"	Esben Duus, Lars Quang	3:46
11.	"Her Song"	Søren Bregendal Sørensen, Lars Quang	5:14
12.	"Stay"	Lars Quang, Esben Duus	3:51
13.	"Hold You Tonight"	Søren Bregendal Sørensen, L. Nielsen	4:02
14.	"Alone Forever"	Lars Quang, Søren Bregendal Sørensen	4:32
15.	"Do Don't Won't"	David Pepke, Søren Bregendal Sørensen, Lars Quang	7:10

== Charts ==
Chart (2004)	Peak position
Danish Albums Chart	22
