= Dialogic listening =

Dialogic listening is an alternative to active listening which was developed by John Stewart and Milt Thomas. The word ‘dialogue’ originated from the Greek words ‘dia’, meaning ‘through’, and ‘logos’, meaning ‘words’. Thus dialogic listening means learning through conversation. Dialogic listening is also known as ‘relational listening’ because with the help of exchange of ideas while listening, we also indirectly create a relation when we use Dialogic listening.

== See also ==
- Informative listening
- Appreciative listening
