= Vinylshakerz =

German EDM duo

- Origin: Germany
- Genres: Dance
- Years active: 2004–present

Vinylshakerz (also known as Vanguard prior to 2005) are a German tech/electro house act, formed in 2004 by Rico Bernasconi and Mike Red, and best known for the 2005 remix of the Murray Head hit "One Night in Bangkok". The producers have also remixed material of other artists, like Wham!, George Michael, Bon Jovi, Toto, My Mine, Boney M, and many more, mainly for dance compilation CDs.

== Discography ==
=== Albums ===
- 2006 Very Superior

=== Singles ===
- 2005 "One Night in Bangkok"
- 2005 "Tekkno Trash (Pay No Cash)"
- 2005 "Club Tropicana"
- 2006 "Daddy Cool"
- 2006 "Luv in Japan"
- 2007 "Forget Me Nots"
- 2008 "Can U Hear Me"
- 2008 "Hypnotic Tango"
- 2009 "Slave (Turn Up the Music)"
- 2010 "One Night in Bangkok" (+ Rico Bernasconi)
- 2011 "Rainbow"

=== Remixes ===
- 2004 Dance United - "Help Asia!"
- 2005 Divided - "Easy Lover" (vs. Grooves)
- 2005 Sunset Strippers - "Falling Stars"
- 2005 Gift - "Yummy Yummy Song"
- 2005 666 - "Supadupafly 2005"
- 2005 Groove Coverage - "Holy Virgin"
- 2005 Mike Austin - "Kylie"
- 2006 Marcus Levin - "Tempt the Fate"
- 2006 Musikk feat. John Rock - "Love Changes (Everything)"
- 2008 Mark´Oh - "I Don't Like Mondays"
- 2010 Charlee - "Boy Like You"
