= Appreciative listening =

Listening behaviour targeting media for enjoyment

Appreciative listening is a type of listening behavior where the listener seeks certain information which they will appreciate, and meet his/her needs and goals. One uses appreciative listening when listening to music, poetry or the stirring words of a speech.

It involves listening to music that one enjoys, people the listener likes to listen to because of their style and the choices the listener make in the films and television he/she watches, radio programmes and plays and musicals in the theatre. Unlike informative listening or relationship listening, appreciative listening does not rely on the message from the speaker it is how one responds as a listener. Our appreciation of what we hear will vary depending on our individual tastes, but will also be affected by three different factors:

== Presentation ==
There are many different factors that encompass presentation including the medium, the setting and the style and personality of a presenter. Of course this works both ways and equally you will have been entranced by others because of the force of their personality and their delivery style.

The environment can also impact your appreciation of the presentation. Seating, temperature, clarity and volume of sound will all impact on whether it’s a good or poor experience.

== Perception ==
Perception is an important factor in appreciative listening. As one is exposed to different experiences his/her perceptions can change. For example: individual's taste in music. We need to listen to various types of music to have a preference over other types and appreciate them. An individual's expectations also affects our perception.

An individual's perception and expectations are driven by his/her attitudes which determine how he/she reacts to and interact to the world in which he/she lives.

== Previous experience ==
Some of our perceptions are clearly influenced by our previous experience and impact on whether or not we enjoy listening to something, or whether we are even willing to listen. Whether our memories evoke pleasant or unpleasant reminders will affect our appreciation. However, it’s important to remain open to new experiences. We can develop our appreciative listening skills.

== See also ==
- Dialogic listening
- Informative listening
- Active listening
- Workplace listening
