= Organizational effectiveness =

Administrative concept

Organizational effectiveness is a concept used in management, economics, and organizational studies to assess how well an organization achieves its intended outcomes.

Definitions and ways of measuring organizational effectiveness vary by context, stakeholder priorities, and disciplinary perspective. As a result, no single, universally accepted model exists for assessing effectiveness across all organizations.

Multiple factors are considered when determining organizational effectiveness: these may include talent management, leadership development, organization design and structure, systems for measuring performance, change management strategies, and smart device integration.

== Economic Models of Organizational Effectiveness ==
In economics, organizational effectiveness can be measured by profitability as well as the minimization of high employee turnover and absenteeism. As the market for employees is subject to supply and demand pressures, firms must offer incentives that are not too low to discourage applicants from applying and not too unnecessarily high as to detract from the firm's profit maximization capability.

As organizational effectiveness translates across a broad array of organizational functions, several different models have been developed to achieve flexibility among organizations with different functions and objectives:

1. The Goal-Attainment Approach determines organizational effectiveness by determining the degree to which a firm achieves the goals it has set. This model has a broad scope and calls for a quantitative evaluation of a firm's profit and productivity maximization, its shareholder value, and its social and environmental impact. This approach assumes that organizations are rational, deliberate, and goal-driven, and prioritizes the result over the means of achieving organizational effectiveness. This paradigm presupposes that organizations are effective to the degree that they fulfill their objectives. Objectives, for example, may be seen as subjective and political, since they represent the values and priorities of consultation. Finally, organizations may be unable to undertake thorough impact evaluations capable of establishing causal attribution.
2. The Systems Resource Approach views the organization as an interrelation of subsystems that function together to affect an organization's desired outcomes. Consequentially, if any one subsystem performs its role poorly, the performance of the entire system is negatively affected. Using this approach, organizational effectiveness is measured with reference to an organization's environmental inputs, the interrelations among its constituent divisions, the degree of flexibility a firm has to respond to changes in the market, and the level of efficiency when delivering output.
3. The Strategic Constituencies Approach establishes that organizational effectiveness is determined by its ability to satisfy the demands imposed by its major shareholders ("constituents") from whom it requires continued support to remain in existence. This model assumes that an organization is composed of several political arenas with vested interests that compete for control over limited resources. As the firm must satisfy the needs of these constituent parts to continue its existence, effectiveness is obtained by ensuring the needs and expectations of the strategic constituencies are fulfilled. This model also accounts for changes in the surrounding environment, whereby an organization must strategically prioritize which constituencies are the most fundamental to its ongoing survival to operate effectively.

== Prominent approaches to evaluating effectiveness ==
Multidimensional approaches

The multidimensional technique measures efficacy in several dimensions at the same time. It is frequently used in conjunction with the goal-attainment approach and the systems resource approach. The Competitive Value Framework is a version of the multidimensional method that covers the three value dimensions that are at the heart of most legitimate definitions: organizational focus, organizational structure, organizational means, and organizational goals. In different situations, these multidimensional methods merely reflect an increasing realization that, in the words of Starbuck and Nystrom, "organizations contain ambiguous, partially incomparable, and incongruous goals."

Reputational approach

The reputational method combines validity requirements with voter satisfaction. The effectiveness of reputation measures is often measured based on the self-reported perceptions of consumers, workers, or outside professionals.

== See also ==
- Management
- Organization
- Theory of the firm
- Workplace listening
