= Reflective listening =

Communication strategy

Reflective listening is a communication strategy in which a listener improves their understanding of a speaker's idea by offering that understanding back to the speaker in order to confirm that the idea has been understood correctly. It is a more specific strategy than general methods of active listening.

== Form of empathy ==
Reflective listening arose from Carl Rogers's school of client-centered therapy in counseling theory.

It is a practice of expressing genuine understanding in response to a speaker as opposed to word-for-word regurgitation. Reflective listening takes practice. Reflective listening is one of the skills of motivational interviewing, a style of communication that works collaboratively to encourage change. Failure to understand the needs of the person speaking can result in errors in work, such as problems being unresolved, or decisions not being quickly made.

== Additional application ==
Reflective listening has been found to be effective in a therapeutic setting. Subjects receiving reflective listening from a counsellor reported better therapeutic relationships and more disclosure of feelings.

A qualitative study of students using song lyrics to practice their reflective listening skills suggested that, according to participants, this allowed for a deeper understanding of the emotional content of the practice experience.

== Reflective listening in open-ended dialogue ==
Skilled communicators frequently echo and restate their conversation partner's words, particularly when reacting to emotional narratives or when they are uncertain of the answer. Researchers Justin Dieter, Tian Wang, Arun Tejasvi Chaganty, Gabor Angeli, and Angel X. Chang have presented a new challenge and accompanying dataset designed to enable chatbots to replicate this behavior by echoing and rephrasing user inquiries to convey empathy or acknowledge ignorance. The authors examine the characteristics of effective rephrasing based on qualitative criteria and assess three different response generation models: a rule-based system that is sensitive to syntax, a neural model using a sequence-to-sequence LSTM with attention (S2SA), and an enhanced version of this neural model with a copy mechanism (S2SA+C). Human assessments indicate that both the S2SA+C and rule-based models produce responses that are similar in quality to those generated by humans. Furthermore, the deployment of S2SA+C in a live customer service environment suggests that this task of generating responses is a valuable addition to the capabilities of real-world conversational agents.

== See also ==
- Clean language
- Focusing (psychotherapy)
- Motivational interviewing
