= Active listening =

Technique of both listening to what is said and replying with an accurate summary

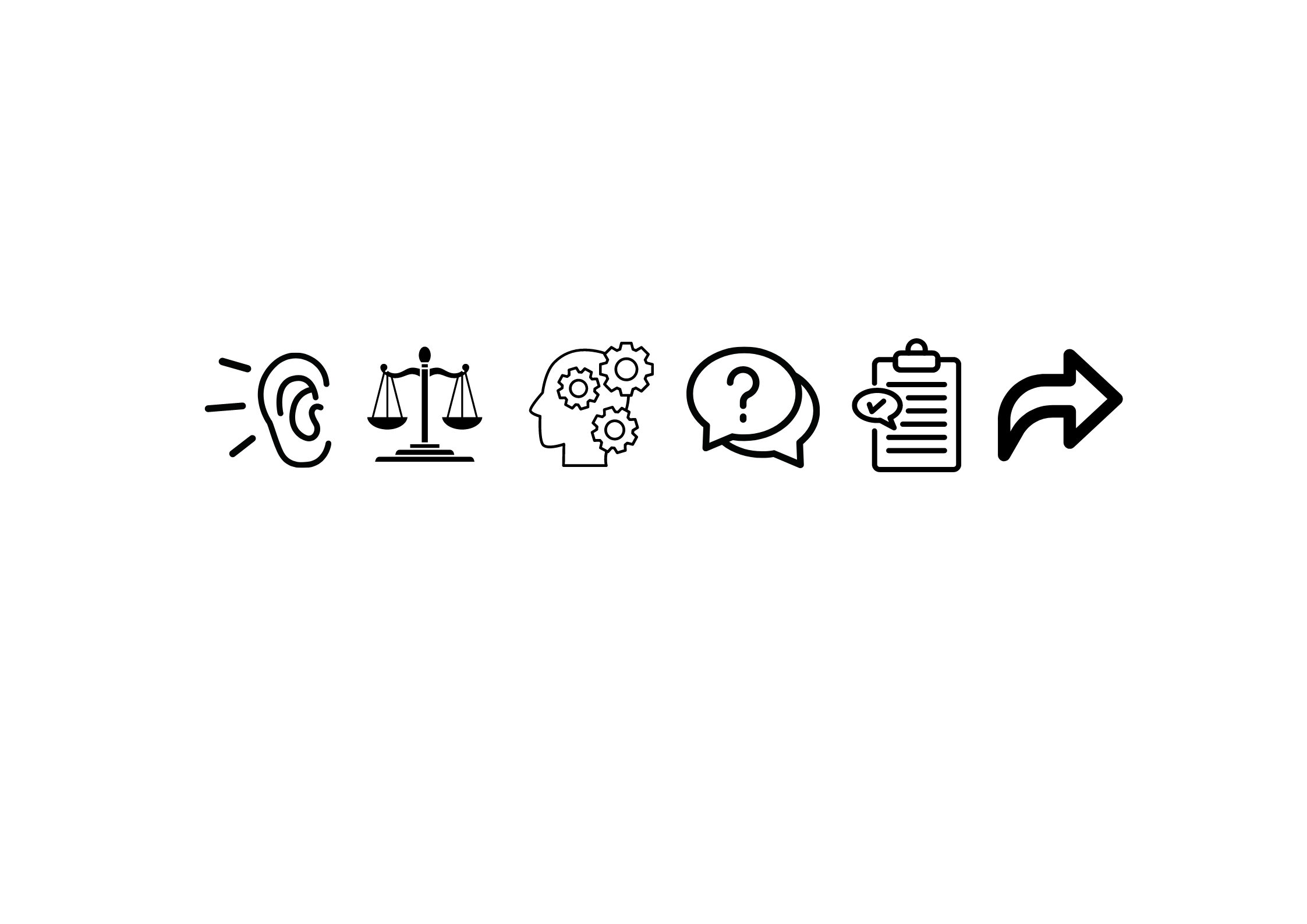
Core components of active listening

Active listening is the act of intentionally engaging with communication. Speakers receive confirmation that their point is coming across and listeners absorb more information, comprehension, and understanding by being consciously engaged. The goal of active listening is to eliminate any misunderstandings and establish clear communication of thoughts, perceptions, and ideas between the speaker and listener. Research has demonstrated that active listening promotes trust and reduces misunderstandings.

== History ==
Psychologists Carl Rogers and Richard Farson published the essay Active Listening in 1987, coining the term.

Practicing active listening also emphasized Rogers' (1980) concept of three facilitative conditions for effective counseling; empathy, genuineness, and unconditional positive regard. Rogers and Farson write: "Active listening is an important way to bring about changes in people. Despite the popular notion that listening is a passive approach, clinical and research evidence clearly shows that sensitive listening is a most effective agent for individual personality change and group development. Listening brings about changes in peoples' attitudes toward themselves and others; it also brings about changes in their basic values and personal philosophy. People who have been listened to in this new and special way become more emotionally mature, more open to their experiences, less defensive, more democratic, and less authoritarian."

== Techniques of active listening ==
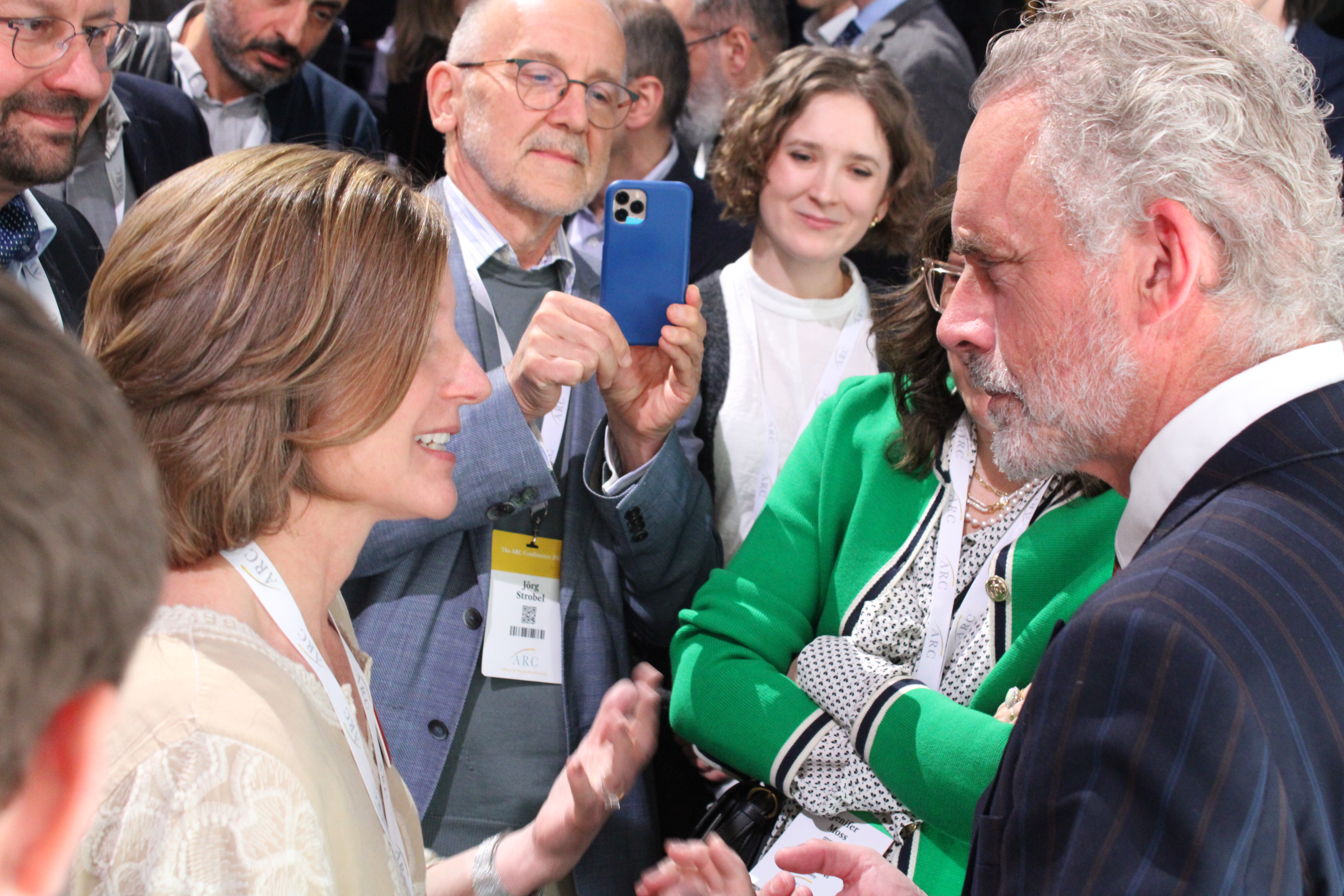
Psychologist Jordan Peterson performing active listening to the verbal and non-verbal messages of an audience member, Kimberly Ells, after a talk, London, 2025.

When practicing active listening, the listener must pay attention to what the speaker is attempting to communicate and elicit clarification where necessary for comprehension. Most individuals overestimate their capacity to employ active listening.

From the speaker's perspective, active listening is a multidimensional construct, shown by attention, comprehension, and positive intention.

Active listening includes further understanding and closeness between the listener and speaker. The more basic ways this is done are through paraphrasing, reflective emotion, and open-ended questions. Paraphrasing involves putting the speaker's message in one's words to demonstrate one's understanding and continue the discussion. Reflective emotion involves identifying the speaker's feelings, whether expressed or not, and responding to those feelings that will further validate the person's emotional state. On the other hand, open-ended questions permit the interviewee to expound on their responses, thus allowing deeper insight into their thoughts and experiences and encouraging a more inclusive dialogue.

These skills find their real-life applications in their efficiency. For example, paraphrasing clarifies possible miscommunications by summarizing the speaker's words and verifying the accuracy. Emotion reflection helps to establish empathy with a speaker so that he/she feels appreciated and understood. Open-ended questions, such as "What did you think of that?" or "Can you further explain what that felt like?" describe ideas and feelings that deepen the conversation.

Active listening techniques include maintaining eye contact, minimizing distractions, and seeking clarification when necessary. These techniques can help listeners engage with others in an attentive and respectful manner and facilitate effective communication.

=== Comprehension ===
The first step in the active listening process is that of comprehension. Comprehension is a shared meaning between parties in communication. This can be done through top-down or bottom-up listening strategies. Top-down listening for comprehension will involve preparing for what message is likely going to be given, attempting to organize what is being communicated, and listening for summarizations or shifts in topic. Bottom-up listening for comprehension will involve an attentiveness to emphasized words such as longer or louder words. In addition, careful attention should be paid to repeated parts of the message being communicated. Attentiveness can be emphasized not just in one's ability to listen, but to listen and respond with sensitivity to particular needs or cultural norms. For example, if a person is listening to someone communicate with a disability such as autism, that person will need to pay close attention and forego common methods of organizing information as it is received. One needs to be patient with them not understanding at first. In many of today's cultures, comprehension may include a knowledge of people using neutral pronouns or preferred pronouns. In order to listen for comprehension, it will be important for a receiver to be aware and understand these cultural norms.

=== Retaining ===
Retaining is the second step in the process. Retaining information is a necessary factor to the active listening process, as it is the process of storing and recalling data. As memory is involved in the active listening process, the information is retained by how meaningful and relevant it is to the listener, and the engagement behind what is being said. Some ways to retain information involve taking notes or making an already known association to what is being covered within the conversation. Retaining information from messages being received is increased with how meaningful what is being said and using repetition so the brain can retain the information. For example, information is best retained in adults experience in what is being said over and over. Communicates back and forth with another communicator about the topic, and maintains visual contact with the source of the message being sent.

=== Responding ===
There are three basic steps for responding in the following order:

1. Paraphrase: Explain what one believes has been said in one's own words.
2. Clarify: Ensure that one understands what has been said through asking questions.
3. Summarize: Offer a concise overview of what one believes the main points and intent of the message received are.

Here are the guidelines to help fine tune one's ability to follow these steps:

1. Pay attention to the message being presented. Allow time for a response, be focused on the moment, and pay attention to your body language.
2. Have an open mind being open to new ideas and perspectives. Refrain from thinking about one's own response to what is being presented.
3. Refrain from offering judgement on anything the other person says.
4. Observe non-verbal content and reflect on what is being said. Reflect the speaker's emotion and what is being said, to validate the speaker's experience, and strengthen overall connection.
5. Clarify the information being given by asking unbiased questions. Ask open ended questions or probing questions to get more depth in the conversation. Lastly, ask for elaborations on any doubts or confusion that may have occurred within the conversation.
6. Summarize important themes that appeared in the conversation to solidify your comprehension of the other person’s point of view.
7. Share your perspective, suggestions, or ideas on what was conversed to come up with a solution or common resolution both the speaker and listener can agree on.

== Applications of active listening ==
Active listening is used in a wide variety of situations, including public interest advocacy, community organizing, tutoring, medical workers talking to patients, HIV counseling, helping suicidal persons, management, counseling, and journalistic settings. In groups it may aid in reaching consensus. It may also be used in casual conversation or small talk to build understanding. Active listening plays a large role in the success of a leader. Leaders need to build trust and respect with those around them and mastering the skills of active listening will help them greatly.

A listener can employ several active listening techniques to increase the quality of communication, including repetition, paraphrasing, and reflection.

The proper use of active listening results in getting people to open up, avoiding misunderstandings, resolving conflict, and building trust. In a medical context, benefits may include increased patient satisfaction, improved cross-cultural communication, improved outcomes, or decreased litigation.

=== Active listening in music ===
Active listening has been developed as a concept in music and technology by François Pachet, researcher at Sony Computer Science Laboratory, Paris. Active listening in music refers to the idea that listeners can be given some degree of control on the music they listen to, by means of technological applications mainly based on artificial intelligence and information theory techniques, by opposition to traditional listening, in which the musical media is played passively by some neutral device

=== Active listening in healthcare and education ===
Active listening is a critical communication skill with significant applications in both healthcare and education. In healthcare, active listening enables practitioners to understand better patients’ concerns, including unspoken fears or expectations, which can lead to improved diagnoses, treatment adherence, and patient satisfaction. According to Lang, Floyd, and Beine (2000), recognizing subtle verbal and nonverbal “clues” during patient interactions enhances communication and fosters trust between patients and healthcare providers. A more recent systematic review further states that active listening plays a key role in patient satisfaction during surgeon-patient consultations, especially in building rapport and trust.

In education, active listening is equally impactful, fostering collaboration between educators, students, and parents. McNaughton et al. (2008) developed the LAFF strategy, a structured method of active listening that includes empathetic engagement, asking open-ended questions, focusing on concerns, and identifying actionable steps. Teachers trained in this strategy have demonstrated improved communication skills and stronger relationships with parents, creating a more supportive learning environment. This is expanded upon by the framing of active listening as a teachable skill, a skill central also to intercultural communication education. Structured classroom approaches incorporated into education can help students develop intercultural competence and empathy through the practice of active listening.

=== Active listening in intercultural and intersectional contexts ===
Beyond formal education, active listening plays a powerful role in intercultural communication and identity-based dialogue by creating a space for empathy, reflection, and mutual understanding. In conversations where participants bring different cultural backgrounds or perspectives, active listening can help reduce assumptions and foster an environment where individuals feel heard and respected. A 2016 study based on a single-class activity demonstrated how classroom-based dialogues centered around race, ethnicity, and identity benefit from active listening practices, allowing students to explore their avowed and ascribed identities while developing greater cultural sensitivity through listening. Integrating active listening into these interactions promotes trust and encourages participants to move beyond surface-level exchanges.

=== Active listening in digital contexts ===
With the increasing use of digital communication tools, especially during the COVID-19 pandemic, active listening has taken a new importance in remote settings. In a comprehensive 2021 study, Dr. Karin Wahl-Jorgensen found that conducting research interviews via Zoom led to deeper forms of engagement, where both the interviewer and interviewee demonstrated heightened attentiveness and emotional presence. The digital environment, with fewer distractions and more focus on verbal cues, encouraged sustained listening and reflection.

== Barriers to active listening ==
A number of barriers can impede upon an individual's ability to listen intentionally, such as rehearsal, when the listener is more focused on preparing a response and filtering, when the listener focuses only on what they expect to hear.

=== Environmental barriers ===
Environmental barriers are brought about by the speaker's environment. Some examples include noises, smells, bad cell reception, and any other factors that make it difficult to hear and process information. Sometimes it is due to the language the speaker uses—such as high sounding and bombastic words that can lead to ambiguity. Other barriers include distractions, trigger words, vocabulary, and limited attention span. Environmental barriers likely can not be eliminated but they can be managed.

=== Physiological barriers ===
Physiological barriers are those that are brought about by the listener's body. They can be temporary or permanent. Hearing loss and deficiencies are usually permanent boundaries. Temporary physiological barriers include headaches, earaches, hunger or fatigue of the listener. Another physiological boundary is the difference between the slow rate of most speech and the brain's ability to process that information. Typically, the brain can process around 500 words per minute while the average rate of speech for speakers is 125 words per minute. This difference make it easy for the mind to wander.

=== Psychological barriers ===
Psychological barriers interfere with one's willingness and mental capacity for listening. Pre-existing biases can lead to listening to someone else's argument for its weaknesses, ignoring its strengths. This can lead to a competitive advantage in a political debate, or by a journalist to provoke a strong response from an interviewee, and is known as "ambushing". Individuals in conflict often blindly contradict each other. On the other hand, if one finds that the other party understands, an atmosphere of cooperation can be created.

=== Shift response ===
Shift response is a type of conversational narcissism—the tendency of listeners to turn the topic to themselves without showing sustained interest in others. A support response is the opposite of a shift response; it is an attention giving method and a cooperative effort to focus the conversational attention on the other person. Instead of being me-oriented like shift response, it is we-oriented. It is the response a competent communicator is most likely to use.

=== Overcoming active listening barriers ===
The active listening technique is used to improve personal communications in organizations. Listeners put aside their own emotions and ask questions and paraphrase what the speaker says to clarify and gain a better understanding of what the speaker intended to say. Distractions that disrupt the listener's attention are one of the major barriers to effective listening. These include external factors such as background noise and physical discomfort, and internal distractions, such as thoughts about other things and lack of focus. Another barrier is the use of technology, which can divide attention or introduce distractions. Misinterpretations of the speaker's intent is also a common challenge, especially when assumptions are made when listeners "read between the lines". This problem can be mitigated by asking the speaker what they mean when it is unclear, though this is not guaranteed to work every time.

A strong disagreement hinders the ability to listen closely to what is being said. Eye contact and appropriate body languages are seen as important components to active listening, as they provide feedback to the speaker. The stress and intonation used by the speaker may also provide information to the listener, which is not available in the written word.

== Criticisms of active listening ==
While active listening is widely regarded as an effective communication technique, several scholars have highlighted potential limitations in its application. In some contexts, particularly within educational development and training, active listening can become overly procedural, prioritizing structured techniques over authentic connection. This may lead to surface-level interactions that feel performative rather than meaningful. Additionally, studies have shown that while active listening behaviors are generally received positively, they do not always result in improved relational outcomes, suggesting that its effectiveness can vary based on contexts and interpersonal dynamics. These critiques point to the importance of applying active listening with cultural awareness and genuine empathy, rather than relying solely on technique.

A Munich-based marital therapy study conducted by Dr. Kurt Hahlweg and associates found that even after employing active listening techniques in the context of couples therapy, the typical couple was still distressed.

Active listening was criticized by John Gottman's The Seven Principles for Making Marriage Work as being of limited usefulness:

Active listening asks couples to perform Olympic-level emotional gymnastics when their relationship can barely walk... After studying some 650 couples and tracking the fate of their marriages for up to fourteen years, we now understand that this approach to counseling doesn't work, not just because it's nearly impossible for most couples to do well, but more importantly because successful conflict resolution isn't what makes marriages succeed. One of the most startling findings of our research is that most couples who have maintained happy marriages rarely do anything that even partly resembles active listening when they're upset.

Robert F. Scuka defends active listening by arguing that:

...a careful reading of the Hahlweg et al. (1984) study reveals that Gottman cites only certain (one-sided) results from the study. He also overlooks several important considerations that call into question his implied dismissal of the RE model as a legitimate therapeutic intervention for distressed couples.

== See also ==
- Appreciative listening – Listening behaviour targeting media for enjoyment
- Computer-mediated communication – Human connection through electronic devices
- Dialogic listening – Alternative to active listening emphasizing understanding through conversation
- Four-sides model – Communication theory model
- Informational listening – Listening focused on understanding a message
- Intercultural Communication – Study of communication across different cultures and groups
- Nonviolent Communication – Communication process intended to increase empathy
- Person-centered care – Healthcare approach with patients' active participation in treatment
- Reflective listening – Communication strategy
- Workplace listening – Active listening in a professional environment
