= Informational listening =

Listening focused on understanding a message

The process of informational listening focuses on the ability of an individual to understand a speaker's message. It is a huge part of everyday life, and failing to understand the concept of informational listening can be very detrimental to one's quality of life and to their contribution to society. Much of the listening people engage in on a regular basis falls under the blanket of listening for information. In the office, people listen to their superiors for instructions about what they are to do. At school, students listen to teachers for information that they are expected to understand for quizzes and tests. In all areas of life, informational listening plays a huge role in human communication.

== Potential hindrances ==
When listening to a person's message, it is common to overlook aspects of the conversation or make judgments before all of the information is presented. This lack of effective comprehension is detrimental to communication and is illustrated effectively by several specific obstacles. Chief among these obstacles are confirmation bias and the vividness effect, both of which distort the speaker's message by severely affecting the perception of a particular topic.

=== Confirmation bias ===
Confirmation bias is the tendency to pick out aspects of a conversation that support one's own beliefs and values. This psychological process proves to have a detrimental effect on communication for several reasons.

First, confirmation bias tends to become involved in conversation before the speaker finishes his/her message. As a result, an opinion is formed without first obtaining all pertinent information. This, in turn, leads to uneducated thinking and fallacious judgments that could later affect others.

Second, confirmation bias detracts from a person's ability to be open-minded. For example, when listening to a statement, an individual may hear something at the beginning of the conversation that arouses a specific emotion. Whether this is anger or frustration or anything else, it could have a profound impact on that person's perception of the rest of the conversation. If they were to become angry about a statement the speaker made early in the conversation, they would likely be averse to accepting arguments presented later in the discourse.

To combat this bias and its consequences, an individual must be aware of it and its effects. With this knowledge, an individual can learn to critically judge both sides of an argument before coming to a conclusion.

=== Vividness effect ===
The vividness effect explains how vivid or highly graphic and dramatic events affect an individual's perception of a situation. This phenomenon has been amplified by the media in recent decades. With the use of media technology, graphic images can be used to portray an event. While this makes the process of receiving news easier and more enjoyable, it can also blow a situation out of proportion. One year after the Columbine High School massacre, about 60 percent of the people who responded to a survey by USA Weekend said that they felt a shooting was likely at their own school. The reality was much different; in fact, the likelihood of a school shooting is negligible across America.

The vividness effect was only amplified by the media. It existed long before the advent of television or radio. When observing an event in person, an individual is automatically drawn toward the sensational or vivid aspects. Thus, a person becomes quick to believe that all aspects of an event are bad if they only remember the vivid parts that offended them. To counter this, an individual must be aware of and deal with the inclination to the dramatic and offensive, act accordingly. One must resist the temptation to jump to conclusions and instead weigh all facts before judging.

== Effective listening ==
In addition to avoiding the two major mistakes listed above, there are things one must do to be a competent informational listener.

=== Memory ===
To understand what is said in the present, one must remember what has been said before; and for the message to have impact, one must remember at least parts of it at some point in the future. The most obvious memory aid is simply taking notes, but it is also helpful to create a mental outline of the message as it is being heard.

=== Identification ===
Identify the main point that the speaker is trying to bring across. When the main point has been deduced, one can begin to sort out the rest of the information and decide where it belongs in the mental outline. Before getting the big picture of a message, it can be difficult to focus on what the speaker is saying, because it is impossible to know where any particular piece of information fits.

=== Questions ===
It is usually helpful to ask oneself questions about the speaker's message. If the listener is mentally asking questions about what is being said, it is a good sign that he/she is actively involved in effective informational listening.

== See also ==
- Active listening – Technique of both listening to what is said and replying with an accurate summary
