= Emilíana Torrini discography =

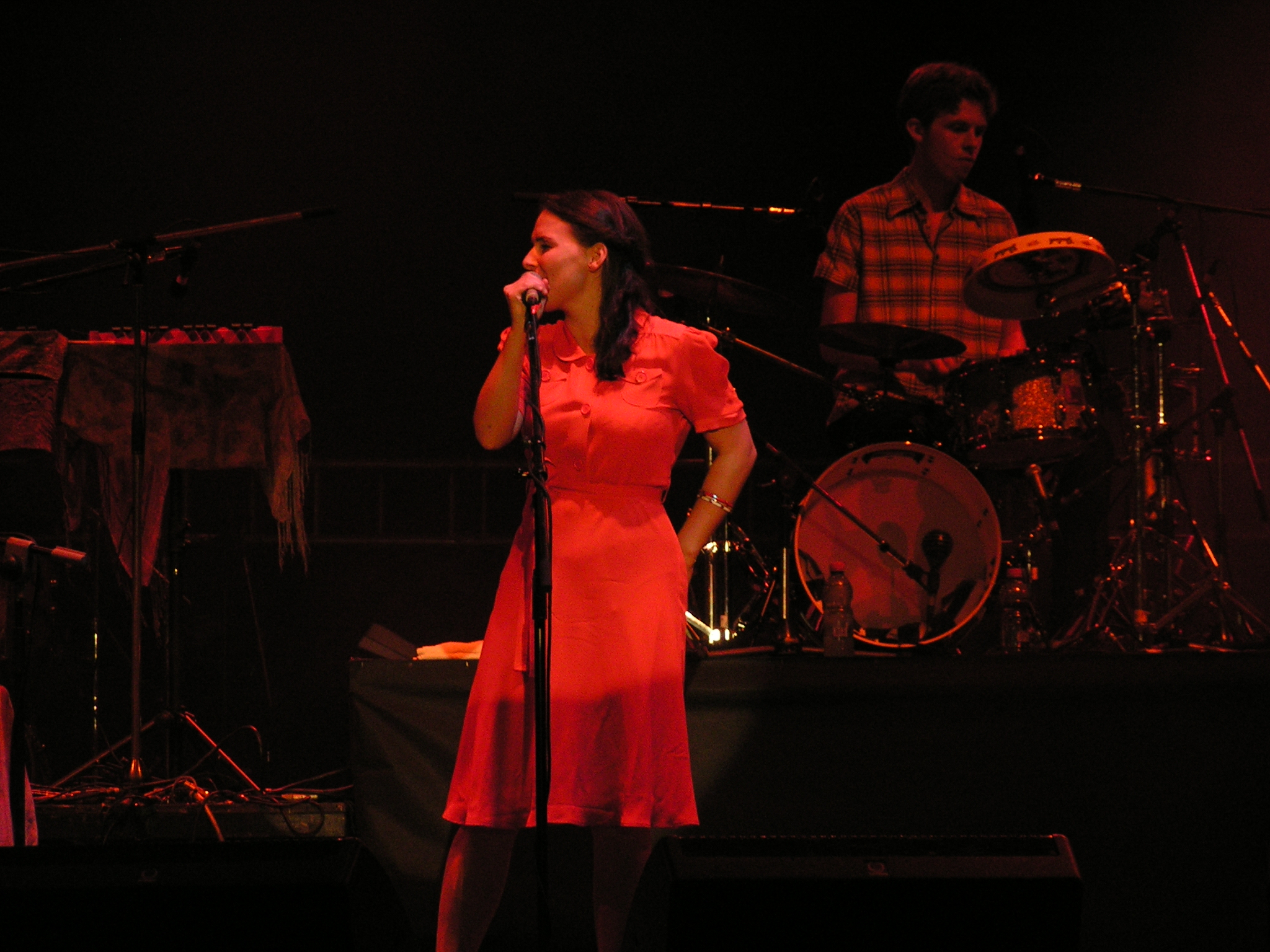
- Torrini performing in June 2005, in Haifa
- Studio albums: 7
- Live albums: 1
- Compilation albums: 1

The discography of Icelandic singer-songwriter and musician Emilíana Torrini consists of seven solo albums, one compilation album, one live album with the Colorist Orchestra, one album as a member of the Icelandic band Spoon and one collaboration album with Canadian musician Kid Koala, as well as multiple singles and collaboration songs. Her first two studio albums have been released only in Iceland by Japis Records. One Little Indian released her 1999 album Love in the Time of Science. Her further releases are through Rough Trade Records.

== Albums ==
=== Studio albums ===
Title	Album details	Peak chart positions									
Title	Album details	ISL	AUS	AUT	BEL (FL)	BEL (WA)	FRA	GER	NLD	SWI	UK
Crouçie d'où là	Released: 1995; Label: JAPIS; Iceland only	—	—	—	—	—	—	—	—	—	—
Merman	Released: 1996; Label: JAPIS; Iceland only	—	—	—	—	—	—	—	—	—	—
Love in the Time of Science	Released: 22 November 1999; Label: One Little Indian	—	—	—	—	—	—	—	—	—	—
Fisherman's Woman	Released: 31 January 2005; Label: Rough Trade	—	90	—	98	97	67	64	—	73	94
Me and Armini	Released: 8 September 2008; Label: Rough Trade	—	78	32	56	—	56	19	94	71	96
Tookah	Released: 6 September 2013; Label: Rough Trade	—	—	—	69	42	44	51	91	36	86
Racing the Storm (with the Colorist Orchestra)	Released: 17 March 2023; Label: Bella Union	—	—	—	104	182	—	—	—	—	—
Miss Flower	Released: 21 June 2024; Label: Grönland Records	—	—	—	-	-	—	79	—	—	—
"—" denotes a recording that did not chart or was not released in that territory.

=== Compilation albums ===
- Rarities - Released 2000, reissued 2010

=== Collaboration albums ===
- Spoon (1994) - with Spoon
- The Colorist & Emilíana Torrini (2016) - a semi-live album with The Colorist Orchestra
- Music To Draw To: Satellite (2017) - with Kid Koala

=== Singles ===
Song	Year	Peak chart positions											Album
Song	Year	ICL	AUS	AUT	BEL (FL)	BEL (WA)	FIN	GER	NLD	SWI	SPA	UK	Album
"Dead Things"	1999	—	—	—	—	—	—	—	—	—	—	—	Love in the Time of Science
"Baby Blue"	1999	—	—	—	—	—	—	—	—	—	—	—	Love in the Time of Science
"To Be Free"	1999	1	—	—	—	—	—	—	—	—	—	—	Love in the Time of Science
"Easy"	2000	—	—	—	—	—	—	—	—	—	—	63	Love in the Time of Science
"Unemployed in Summertime"	2000	—	—	—	—	—	—	—	—	—	—	63	Love in the Time of Science
"To Be Free" (reissue)	2000	—	—	—	—	—	—	—	—	—	—	44	Love in the Time of Science
"Lifesaver"	2004	46	—	—	—	—	—	—	—	—	—	—	Fisherman's Woman
"Sunnyroad"	2005	—	—	—	—	—	—	—	—	—	—	82	Fisherman's Woman
"Heartstopper"	2005	40	—	—	—	—	—	—	—	—	—	126	Fisherman's Woman
"Me and Armini"	2008	5	—	—	—	—	—	—	—	—	—	—	Me and Armini
"Big Jumps"	2008	8	—	—	—	—	—	—	—	—	—	—	Me and Armini
"Jungle Drum"	2009	1	76	1	1	55	5	1	57	11	14	—	Me and Armini
"Speed of Dark"	2013	6	—	—	—	81	—	—	—	—	—	—	Tookah
"Let's Keep Dancing"	2024	1	—	—	—	—	—	—	—	—	—	—	Miss Flower
"—" denotes a title that did not chart or was not released in given territory.

==== Other charting tracks ====
Year	Song	ICL	Album
2004	"White Rabbit"	34	featured on various compilations
2004	"Stephanie Says"	47	Merman
2004	"Chelsea Morning"	50	Merman
2005	"The Boy Who Giggled So Sweet"	36	Merman
2005	"Blame It on the Sun"	69	Merman
2005	"Someone Knows" (remix) (with Björn Jörundur Friðbjörnsson)	41	featured on various compilations
2005	"Lay Down (Candles in the Rain)"	84	featured on various compilations
2005	"Tvær stjörnur"	85	featured on various compilations
2006	"Nothing Brings Me Down"	41	Fisherman's Woman
2006	"Today Has Been OK"	47	Fisherman's Woman
2006	"Snow"	51	Fisherman's Woman
2006	"Thinking Out Loud"	56	Fisherman's Woman
2006	"Serenade"	57	Fisherman's Woman
2006	"Next Time Around"	59	Fisherman's Woman
2006	"Honeymoon Child"	60	Fisherman's Woman
2006	"At Least It Was"	63	Fisherman's Woman
2006	"Crazy Love"	49	Crouçie d'où là
2006	"I Hope That I Don't Fall in Love with You"	62	Merman

== Other tracks ==
Year	Title	Artist	Album	Notes	Source(s)
1994	Frank Mills	Emilíana Torrini	Hárið		
1994	Taboo	Spoon	Spoon		
1994	Tomorrow	Spoon	Spoon		
1994	Brazilian Sky	Spoon	Spoon		
1994	Observing	Spoon	Spoon		
1995	Leaving	Spoon	Ís Með Dýfu		
1995	Bömpaðu, Baby, Bömpaðu	Fjallkonan	Partý		
1995	Vanishing	LHOOQ	Volume 15 – Technology Alert! (Sampler)		
1995	Sæla	Pláhnetan			
1996	7-Up Days	Slowblow	Fousque		
1996	Flirt	Slowblow	Popp Í Reykjavík		
1996	Candy Man	Emilíana Torrini	Sprelllifandi		
1996	Sound Of Silence	Emilíana Torrini	Stone Free	Simon & Garfunkel cover	
1996	White Rabbit	Emilíana Torrini	Stone Free	A remixed version is featured on the 2011 Sucker Punch soundtrack	
1996	Lay Down (Candles In The Rain)	Emilíana Torrini	Stone Free	Melanie Safka cover	
1996	Ruby Tuesday	Emilíana Torrini	Stone Free	The Rolling Stones cover	
1997	Asking For Love	Emilíana Torrini	Asking For Love		
1997	Tvær Stjörnur	Emilíana Torrini	Megasarlög		
1997	Is Jesus Your Pal?	GusGus	Polydistortion	Slowblow cover	
1997	Why?	GusGus	Polydistortion		
1997	Io E Te	Emilíana Torrini	Veðmálið		
1997	Perlur Og Svín	Emilíana Torrini	Veðmálið		
1997	Leigubíll	Emilíana Torrini & Kanada	Veðmálið		
1997	Heaven Knows	Emilíana Torrini & Björn Jörundur Friðbjörnsson	Veðmálið		
1998	Ten To Twenty	Sneaker Pimps	Album 99	Early promotional copies of Sneaker Pimps' album "Splinter", released in 1998 and titled "Album 99" feature demo versions of the songs "Ten To Twenty" and "Lightning Field", featuring Torrini on lead vocals.	
1998	Lightning Field	Sneaker Pimps	Album 99	Early promotional copies of Sneaker Pimps' album "Splinter", released in 1998 and titled "Album 99" feature demo versions of the songs "Ten To Twenty" and "Lightning Field", featuring Torrini on lead vocals.	
1999	Love In The Time Of Science	Dip	Ḣ-Camp Meets Lo-Fi	Later re-recorded as “Telepathy” and featured on “Love in the Time of Science	
1999	Come Out	Dip	Ḣ-Camp Meets Lo-Fi		
2000	Weird Friendless Kid	Emilíana Torrini	Rarities		
2000	If You Go Away	Emilíana Torrini	Rarities		
2001	101 Reykjavík Theme	Damon Albarn	101 Reykjavík Soundtrack	Remixed by Emilíana Torrini and Charlie Vetter, no vocals	
2002	Hold Your Hand	Paul Oakenfold	Bunkka		
2002	Weebles Fall	Slovo	Nommo		
2002	Absolutely No Point In Anything Anymore	Cheapglue	Sexyhorses		
2002	Gollum's Song	Emilíana Torrini	The Lord of the Rings: The Two Towers Soundtrack		
2002	Heaven's Gonna Burn Your Eyes	Thievery Corporation	The Richest Man In Babylon		
2002	Until The Morning	Thievery Corporation	The Richest Man In Babylon		
2007	Flags	Slovo	Todo Cambia		
2008	Slow	Tricky	Knowle West Boy	features uncredited vocals by Emilíana	
2008	The Wolf Song	Emilíana Torrini	Me & Armini (Japanese Edition)		
2011	Your Collarbone	A Lily	Thunder Ate the Iron Tree		
2013	Life And Death	Emilíana Torrini	Metro Manila Soundtrack		
2013	Life And Death	Dave Pen, Emilíana Torrini	Metro Manila Soundtrack		
2013	Echo Horse (The History Of Horses)	Emilíana Torrini	Tookah	Featured as a bonus track on some editions.	
2013	Moi Moi	Albin de la Simone	Un Homme		
2013	Go With The Flow	Olivier Libaux	Uncovered Queens of the Stone Age		
2013	I Go Out	Steven Mason & Emilíana Torrini			
2014	Nightfall (Pale Blue)	Kid Koala	Men, Women & Children Soundtrack	Later featured on “Music To Draw To: Satellite”	
2017	Adrift	Kid Koala	Music To Draw To: Satellite		
2017	Fallaway	Kid Koala	Music To Draw To: Satellite		
2017	Beneath The Heat	Kid Koala	Music To Draw To: Satellite		
2017	Collapser	Kid Koala	Music To Draw To: Satellite		
2017	Satellite	Kid Koala	Music To Draw To: Satellite		
2017	The Darkest Day	Kid Koala	Music To Draw To: Satellite		
2018	I Hope That I Don't Fall In Love With You	Emilíana Torrini	Adrift Soundtrack	Tom Waits cover. Re-recorded version, originally featured on Merman	
2019	There Is Something In The Forest	Emilíana Torrini & The Colorist Orchestra	Moominvalley Soundtrack		
2019	Crossroads	Helgi Jonsson			
2020	Quintessence	Marketa Irglova, Emiliana Torrini and Aukai	Quintessence		
2020	Harmaborg	Hljómskálinn, Emiliana Torrini and Ham			
2021	Vertu úlfur - Titillag	Emiliana Torrini	Vertu Úlfur - Plays By Unnur Ösp Steánsdóttir		
2025	Telexes	Emiliana Torrini feat. Caroline Catz	The Extraordinary Miss Flower OST		
