= Meerman =

Meerman is a Dutch surname associated with the word meer. It is either an occupational surname meaning "sailor" or a topographic surname for a person who lives by the lake or sea. Notable people with the surname include:

- David Meerman Scott (born 1961), American online marketing strategist and speaker
- Gerard Meerman (1722–1771), Dutch magistrate, scholar, author, and book collector
- Johan Meerman (1753–1815), Dutch politician, scholar and author
- Johannes Meerman (1624–1675), Dutch Golden Age mayor and diplomat
- Karin Meerman (born 1944), Dutch actress
- Kees "Ani" Meerman (1950–2014), Dutch drummer
- Kees Meerman (born 1972), Dutch singer, songwriter, comedian, actor, and voice actor
- Luke Meerman (born 1975), American politician
- Marije Meerman (born 1967), Dutch director, producer, and writer
- Ruben Meerman (born 1971), Australian scientist, educator, author, and public speaker
- Toon Meerman (1933–2023), Dutch footballer

== See also ==
- Variants include Meermann, Merman, de Meerman, Meermans, Mermans, Meremans, Meeremans, and Meiremans.
- Meirman, different etymology
