= Alf Bayrle =

German painter (1900–1982)

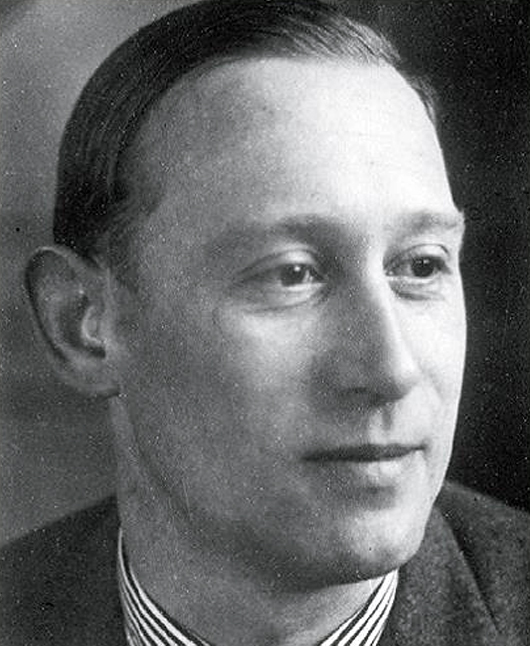
Alf Bayrle

Alf Bayrle (15 December 1900 – 11 September 1982), also known as Alf Singer-Bayrle, was a German painter, printmaker and sculptor.

== Life ==
Bayrle was born in Biberach an der Riss. After his military service and participation in the First World War, he studied from 1918 to 1922 at the State Academy of Fine Arts Stuttgart at the classes of Adolf Hölzel, Robert Poetzelberger, Gottfried Graf, Arnold Waldschmidt; and at the School of Applied Arts in classes of Heinrich and Friedrich Schneidler. That time was the beginning of his friendship with Willi Baumeister and Oskar Schlemmer. In Schlemmer's Triadic Ballet, he participated later and organized the Paris show in 1932.

In 1922 he moved to Munich and continued his studies until 1925. There he studied at Franz von Stuck at the Academy, Hans Hofmann at the School of Fine Arts and took additional lessons from Heinrich Wölfflin at the University. In 1923 and 1924 as a student in Munich he wrote about "the lack of understanding of modern art".

=== Paris ===
In 1926 he moved to Paris and worked there as a painter, at the same time he also studied at the Académie de la Grande Chaumière (at Othon Friesz and André Lhote). His friends in Paris at that time included Colette, André Derain, Rene Jurdain, Paul Poiret, Maurice Ravel. Bayrle followed the invitation of Rene Jurdain to share his studio space, from 1928 to 1934, however, he spent in summertime months in St. Tropez at Madame Aude. In Paris he was in contact with Giorgio de Chirico, Jean Cocteau, Le Corbusier, Raoul Dufy, Aristide Maillol, Henri Matisse and Pablo Picasso. Although an active and recognized member of the Parisian art scene his exhibitions there are poorly documented and researched today. In 1927, he had an exhibition with Arno Breker, who also lived in Paris.

=== Africa ===
In 1934 the Institute of Morphology, run by Leo Frobenius of the University of Frankfurt offered him a position as an artist. The institute offered Bayrle the opportunity to paint without the fear of persecution of the regime. In the same year Frobenius and Bayrle made their first expedition to Africa. Two years later their book about South Abessinia was published which contains 40 plates in photogravure prints of drawings of Alf Bayrle. Until today these drawings, as well as the unpublished have a great importance from a scientific, ethnographic and artistic point of view. Some other expeditions were made to the South of France, Spain, Libya and Ethiopia.

=== Germany ===
In 1937 the work-up of the expeditions was finished and Bayrle moved to Berlin, where 7 November 1937, where his son Thomas Bayrle was born, he became also a painter. In 1939 he was drafted into the military and was taken prisoner. The 1943–44 bombing destroyed much of his recent works. In 1948 he was released from war captivity and moved to Frankfurt and opened a studio there, he was a member of the Professional Association of Visual Artists Frankfurt. In the early postwar period, next to his artistic activity he made scenes and decorations, and taught as an art teacher at the Gutenberg school. His studio was at the Röderbergweg in Frankfurt (near the Zoo) in the same house with his son's studio. In 1966 he opened a second studio in Bonn and in 1968 was a founder member of the artist group "semicolon" and a member of the Artist Group Bonn. Bayrle never wanted a retrospective of his work, so the great exhibition in 1980 showed mostly contemporary works. Alf Bayrle died in 1982 in Rotthalmünster.

When the German author Adam Seide published his novel Rebecca in 1987 he dedicated it in memory of the painter Alf Bayrle.

== Themes ==
Unlike several of his avant-garde contemporaries, Bayrle rejected non-representational painting; instead, he took up and advanced the tradition of figurative painting. His work was influenced by his time with Hans Hofmann, the artists circles in Paris and the expeditions to Africa. During his time in Paris he often painted still life.

Bayrles solo exhibition in 1925, shows figurative works inspired by impressionism. His chief interest was even at this time already in cubism and Paul Cézanne, whose work remained important to him throughout his life. Sina Hofmann Ginsburg and Karla Bilang confirmed "a strong Cezannism" in the work of Alf Bayrle.

Much of his early work was destroyed by bombing; a fortunate circumstance is that he had sold a lot in the 1920s and 1930s. He discovered as a visitor in 1967, the still life "plant with pineapple" in the exhibition of the Kazimir Hagen collection, which he had painted in Paris in 1929. The Africa-topic influenced him even after the expeditions especially his late work. He started a collection of African art and antiques which he had to sell in the late 1940s.

One single known work "Vom Bau des Atlantikwalls" from 1940 ("Building a Bunker, Atlantic Wall" in the Portland Art Museum) shows a scene from his military service.

His late work was focused on heads, which he drew in many ways mostly in ink. They represent various emotions and characters and are characteristic for his turn away from classic portraiture. He signed his works with Bay and in some cases with his full name, some sketches and designs he left unsigned.

Little known is his work as a graphic designer: His poster "Der Reichskolonialbund ruft auch Dich!" (The Reichskolonialbund calls also you) from 1938 is part of the permanent collection of the Victoria and Albert Museum in London and in the collection of the University of California, Berkeley.

== Exhibitions (selected) ==
- Alf Bayrle, Kunsthallen Hansa, Essen 1925
- Alf Bayrle and Arno Breker, Paris 1927
- Alf Bayrle wird 80, Kurfürstliches Gärtnerhaus in Bonn 1980 (Exhibition on his 80th birthday)
- Alf Bayrle, EXPO-Galerie, Frankfurt 1985
- Alf Bayrle, Galerie Rosenberg, 1990
- Objekt Atlas – Feldforschung im Museum. The works of Alf Bayrle in the expeditions, Weltkulturen Museum, 2012. Shown also at: Middlebury College Museum of Art, Vermont 2012 under the title " Environment and object art".

== See also ==
- List of German painters
