= Heartstopper =

Heartstopper may refer to:

- Heartstopper (film), a 2006 horror film
- Heartstopper (graphic novel), a young adult LGBTQ graphic novel and webcomic
  - Heartstopper (TV series), a 2022 Netflix adaptation
  - Heartstopper Forever, the finale to the Netflix series
- "Heartstopper" (song), by Emilíana Torrini
- "Heartstopper", a song by Keith Richards from Crosseyed Heart
