= David Watson (British musician) =

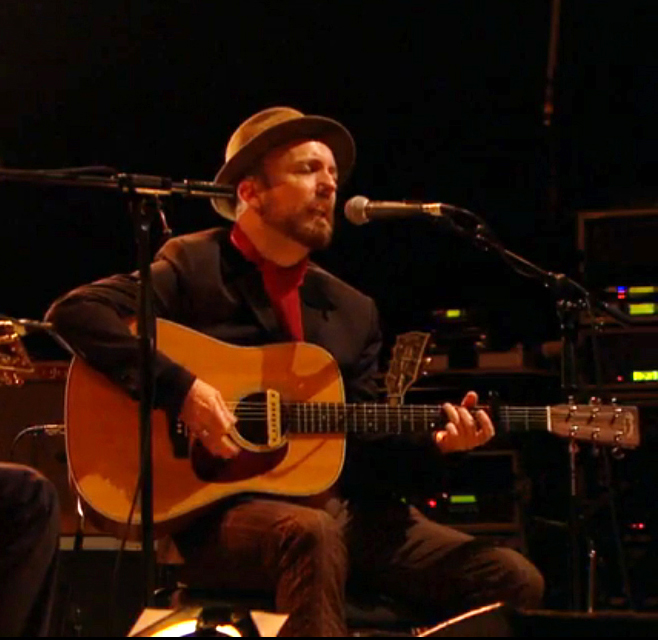
- David Watson performing at the Royal Festival Hall, December 2014

Background information
- Born: London, England
- Occupations: Record producer, singer, guitarist, songwriter
- Instruments: Guitar, banjo, vocals
- Member of: Three Pilgrims

David Watson is an English record producer, singer and musician. Born and raised in North London, he has produced albums for Paul Wassif, Mark Abis, Sam Sallon, Dylan Howe, OMD and Claudia Brücken, and has worked with artists such as Rufus Wainwright, Neil Cowley, Beth Rowley, Eric Clapton and Bert Jansch. He is the father of actress Indica Watson.

== As a producer ==
In 2006 Watson recorded and produced Translation Volume 1 – Live in Soho by the Dylan Howe Quintet with Dylan Howe, and the album was released to critical acclaim. This was followed by Translation Volume 2 - Standards which came out in 2007.

In 2009, Watson began work on an album by the blues/folk guitarist Paul Wassif, which featured the musicians Eric Clapton and Bert Jansch. The album Looking Up Feeling Down was recorded in London's Metropolis Studios, and was released in 2011 on Black Brown & White. It turned out to be Jansch's last appearance on a record before his death in October that year.

Watson worked for over two years producing singer-songwriter Sam Sallon's debut album One for the Road which was released in 2013 on Indigo-Octagon. The album features contributions from The Rails singer Kami Thompson, guitarist Paul Wassif and pianist Neil Cowley. Mojo Magazine praised the album as "a finely crafted debut", while Maverick Magazine called it "a potential album of the year".

Along with Paul Humphreys of British electro band OMD, Watson produced German electropop singer Claudia Brücken's live retrospective album This Happened in 2012. The album was recorded and filmed at the Scala in London's King's Cross the previous year, and both Watson and Humphreys performed alongside guest appearances from Heaven 17, Andy Bell, Andrew Poppy and Propaganda. The live album and DVD were released on There (There) in 2012, and Watson subsequently toured as a member of Brücken's band in the UK and Europe.

Watson has contributed to the last three albums by OMD, English Electric (2013), The Punishment of Luxury (2017) and Bauhaus Staircase (2023). Together with Paul Humphreys, Watson remixed the band's debut single "Electricity" from the original master tapes for a popular commercial for Chanel.

Watson has also performed and sung with many various artists and groups. In July 2004, he sang the Italian piece "L' Ombra della Luce" by Franco Battiato with the Remasterpiece Orchestra featuring Chris Coco and Sasha Puttnam headlining at The Big Chill festival.

In December 2009 he performed at A Not So Silent Night with Rufus & Martha Wainwright, Boy George, Brian Eno and other special guests at the Royal Albert Hall in London. The concert was to be the final performance of Kate McGarrigle, who died the following month.

In December 2013, Watson performed and sang with Paul Wassif at the concert A Celebration of Bert Jansch at London's Royal Festival Hall alongside Robert Plant, Lisa Knapp, Donovan and various members of Pentangle, amongst others. The concert was broadcast by BBC Four in the UK on 28 March 2014 under the name The Genius of Bert Jansch: Folk Blues and Beyond.

He is currently a member of blues folk trio, Three Pilgrims, with Mark Abis and Paul Wassif.

== Selected discography ==
- Dylan Howe Quintet - Translation Volume 1 - Live in Soho (2006)
- Dylan Howe Quintet - Translation Volume 2 - Standards (2007)
- Paul Wassif - Looking Up Feeling Down (2011)
- Claudia Brücken - This Happened (2012)
- Sam Sallon - Kathy's Song EP (2013)
- Sam Sallon - One for the Road (2013)
- Linda Thompson - Won't Be Long Now (2013)
- Mark Abis - Changing Inside (remastered edition)(2013)
- OMD - English Electric (2013)
- Jack Adaptor - J'Accuse! (2014)
- Christopher Cordoba - Holigost (2017)
- OMD - The Punishment of Luxury (2017)
- Indica Watson - I That Am Lost (2017)
- Jack Adaptor - The Spoiler Versions (2018)
- Jack Adaptor - Spirit Is The Power (2018)
- Brücken/Froese - Beginn (2018)
- Jack Adaptor - The Gilded Sound (2019)
- Mark Abis - Live at Broadhempston (2019)
- Andrew Poppy - Hoarse Songs (2019)
- Mark Abis - China Ship (2020)
- Wolfgang Flür - Magazine 1 (2022)
- Vanderwolf - 12 Little Killers (2022)
- OMD - Bauhaus Staircase (2023)
- Vibrations of the Sun - Am I Fading Fast Or Flashing Like Lightning? (2024)
- John Grant - The Art of the Lie (2024)
- Ghosts Of Our Former Selves - Sirens (2026)
