= Big Jumps =

Single by Emilíana Torrini

from the album Me and Armini
- Released: October 13, 2008
- Genre: Indie pop
- Length: 3:02
- Label: Rough Trade
- Songwriter(s): Emilíana Torrini, Dan Carey
- Producer(s): Dan Carey

Emilíana Torrini singles chronology
"Me and Armini" (2008)	"Big Jumps" (2008)	"Jungle Drum" (2009)

"Big Jumps" is the second single by Emilíana Torrini released from her third album Me and Armini. It was released as a digital download only on October 13, 2008. The song didn't chart.

== Critical reception ==
The critical reception towards the song was warm; Popmatters reviewer Spencer Tricker called "Big Jumps" the "catchiest tune" on the album (alongside Jungle Drum), "every bit as good as the singles from Fisherman's Woman". Andrew Leahey from allmusic wrote that the song features "strings of endearing doop-de-doop vocals and a commercial pop chorus" and Matthew Allard from ARTISTdirect said it "up[s] the tempo in a sunny, radio-ready way".

== Track listing ==
From 7digital

1. "Big Jumps" — 3:02
