= Concentric Group =

1925 painting by Oskar Schlemmer

Coordinates: 48.7802°N 9.1869°E

- Konzentrische Gruppe (German)
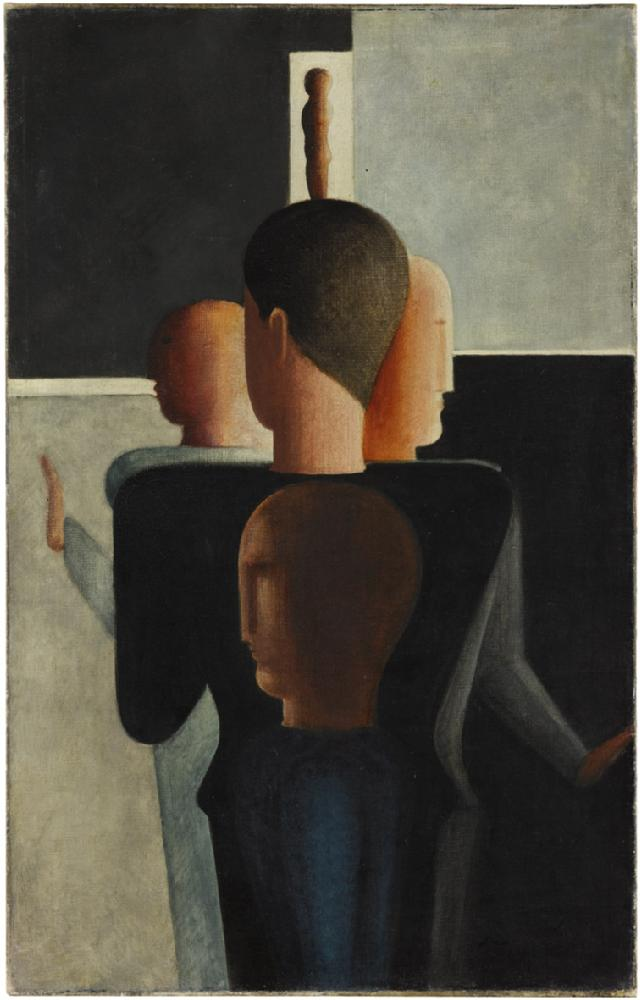
- Artist: Oskar Schlemmer
- Year: 1925
- Medium: oil on canvas
- Dimensions: 97.5 cm × 62 cm (38.4 in × 24 in)
- Location: Staatsgalerie Stuttgart, Stuttgart

Concentric Group is an oil on canvas painting by Oskar Schlemmer, from 1925.

== Description ==
The painting is an oil on canvas with dimensions of 97.5 × 62 centimeters. It is in the collection of the Staatsgalerie Stuttgart, in Stuttgart.

== Analysis ==
The painting is based on a sketch from 1921. It sold at auction in 2011, with a starting price of 7,500 euros, and bought for 13,125 euros. the sketch's size is 45.2 x 34.3 cm. The painting concentric group was created with oil paints on canvas. The work is characterized by a classic symmetry.

Schlemmer was influenced by Cubism, but is also used for constructivist techniques. Already in 1922, he sketched a fun and colorful puppet, and it combined what he is doing all his life, namely, the desire to portray the figure, which, like a puppet, moves in a given space. Schlemmer is interested not only in the individual and the mental abyss and misery, but also for young people who are geometrically abstract. Schlemmer's work can be seen not only in paintings but also in statues and the performing arts; he was also a sculptor and choreographer, and created a lot of ballet performances.

Schlemmer body of work included around 750 paintings, 650 watercolors, 1000 drawings (pencil, ink, Indian ink, pastels, etc.) and about 35 sculptures, as well as 20 scene work. Schlemmer was one of the first Bauhaus masters, who became a victim of the National Socialist regime, as a result, he lost his position of professor, as well as several of his works were destroyed.

The work had been designated "degenerate" and removed from the Nationalgalerie Berlin in 1937; from there it came to the Staatsgalerie in 1950.

== Legacy ==
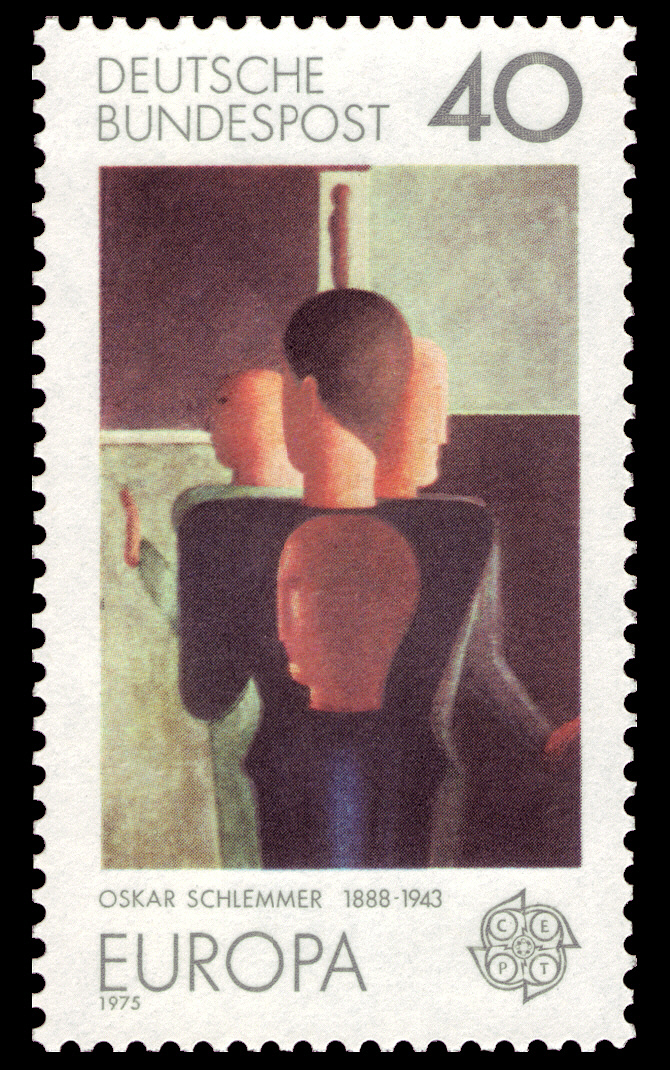
Stamp series Europa 1975

In 1975, the work was used on a postage stamp, for the Deutsche Bundespost's 40th anniversary.

== Sources ==
- Karin von Maur; Fritz Thyssen-Stiftung (1979). Oskar Schlemmer. Vol. 1. Prestel.
- Victoria Charles; Joseph Manca; Megan McShane (24 November 2014). 1000 Meisterwerke der Malerei. Parkstone International. pp. 454–. ISBN 978-1-78310-405-5.
