= Paul Wassif =

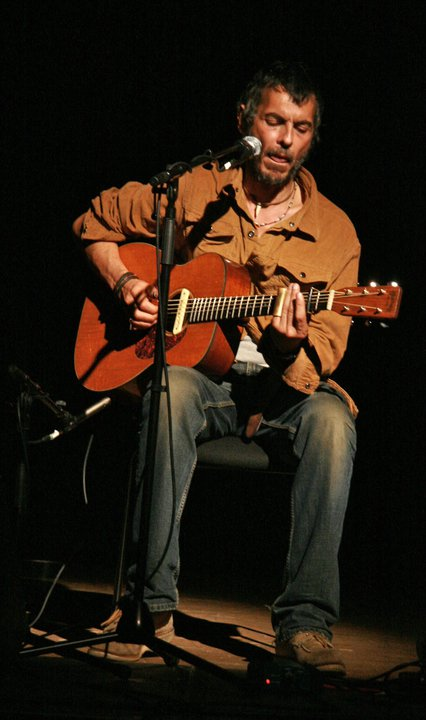
- Paul Wassif performing at Queen's Hall, Edinburgh, August 2010

Background information
- Born: 25 April 1963 (age 63); Bristol, England
- Genres: Folk, folk rock, blues
- Occupations: Guitarist, singer-songwriter
- Instruments: Guitar, banjo, vocals
- Labels: Black Brown & White
- Formerly of: The London Cowboys
- Website: www.paulwassif.com

Paul Wassif (born 25 April 1963) is a British musician, guitarist, and singer songwriter.

== Early career ==
Paul Wassif's early career included a brief spell with Punk/Rock band The London Cowboys. This was followed by various stints in New York City bands including The Ugly Americans with ex New York Dolls members, Jerry Nolan and Sylvain Sylvain. The 2008 London Cowboys retrospective release 'Relapse' features the song 'Dragging in the Dirt' with band founder Steve Dior.
Wassif formed a group in the late 1990s with Henry Olsen (of Primal Scream) named Distant Cousins. The band toured across America with Eric Clapton on his Pilgrim World Tour in 1998 performing at such venues as New York's Madison Square Garden. Just before the tour Clapton gave Wassif his Martin 000-28 EC signature model acoustic guitar which he occasionally borrowed back during the tour. Wassif has also appeared as a featured guitarist on albums by Steve Knightley, Sam Sallon, Mark Abis and Saiichi Sugiyama.
Wassif is also a member of Blues/Folk trio Three Pilgrims with Mark Abis and David Watson.

== With Bert Jansch ==
Wassif collaborated on two of Bert Jansch's albums. On the album Edge of A Dream, released in 2002, Paul duets with Bert on 'Black Cat Blues'. This track was subsequently featured on the soundtrack of 'Calendar Girls'. On Bert Jansch's final studio album The Black Swan, released in 2006, Paul co-wrote 'Magdalina's Dance' and performs on 'My Pocket's Empty' and 'A Woman Like You'.
In an interview for Acoustic Guitar Magazine Bert Jansch described Paul Wassif as "a fantastic player. He's got a very, very gentle touch".

Wassif also played regularly on stage with Bert Jansch. One review of Bert's 2007 Somerset House concert (that also featured Bernard Butler and Beth Orton) described that "Wassif adds a country tinge to the music, which remains as sweet as ever as their first number ignores vocals to revel instead in these guitarists' undiluted skill". In August 2010 Paul opened for Bert Jansch playing two nights at the Queen's Hall as part of the Edinburgh Festival.

On 3 December 2013 he performed on four songs at the concert "A Celebration of Bert Jansch" at London's Royal Festival Hall alongside Robert Plant, Lisa Knapp, Donovan and various members of Pentangle, amongst others. The concert was broadcast by BBC4 in the UK on 28 March 2014 under the name The Genius of Bert Jansch: Folk Blues and Beyond.

== Looking Up Feeling Down (album) ==
Looking Up Feeling Down

Studio album by Paul Wassif
- Released: September 2011
- Labels: Black Brown & White
- Producers: Paul Wassif, David Watson

Paul Wassif's first solo album Looking Up Feeling Down was released digitally on 5 May 2011 and on CD on 5 September 2011. The album features guest appearances from Bert Jansch and Eric Clapton playing and recording together for the first time on two tracks; 'Please Don't Leave', written by Paul Wassif and 'Southbound Train' written by Big Bill Broonzy. Jansch also played on a further three tracks on the album in what was to be his final released recording. The album also features drummer Evan Jenkins from the Neil Cowley Trio, David Watson, James Watson, Robin Clayton, Lynn Glaser, Steve Counsel and Seamus Beaghen.

Looking Up Feeling Down was produced by Paul Wassif and David Watson, mastered by Tony Cousins at Metropolis Studios in London, and is released on Black Brown & White Records, a record label owned by Stephen Lyttelton (son of jazz musician Humphrey Lyttelton) and Karen Sonego (daughter of Brazilian folk musician, Zé Tapera)
