= Bauhaus Staircase =

Studio album by Orchestral Manoeuvres in the Dark
- Released: 27 October 2023
- Genre: Synth-pop
- Length: 42:50
- Labels: White Noise, 100%
- Producer: OMD

Orchestral Manoeuvres in the Dark chronology
| The Punishment of Luxury (2017) | Bauhaus Staircase (2023) |

Singles from Bauhaus Staircase
- 1. "Bauhaus Staircase" Released: 22 August 2023; 2. "Slow Train" Released: 18 September 2023; 3. "Veruschka" Released: 5 October 2023; 4. "Anthropocene" Released: 27 October 2023; 5. "Kleptocracy" Released: 26 January 2024; 6. "Look at You Now" Released: 11 October 2024

Bauhaus Staircase is the fourteenth studio album by the English electronic band Orchestral Manoeuvres in the Dark (OMD), and the fourth since their 2006 reformation. Released on 27 October 2023 by White Noise Records (and by 100% Records in the UK and Ireland), it is their first album in six years since The Punishment of Luxury (2017). The record was largely inspired by world politics during the late 2010s and early 2020s. Its release was preceded by three singles: the title track, "Slow Train", and "Veruschka".

Bauhaus Staircase received positive reviews. Record Collector and Classic Pop magazines named it the best new album release in their respective November 2023 issues, while other outlets considered it to be OMD's finest work since the mid-1980s. The record debuted at number two on the UK Albums Chart, becoming the group's highest-charting studio album in their home country, and matching the peak of 1988's The Best of OMD. It topped the UK Independent Albums Chart.

== Background ==
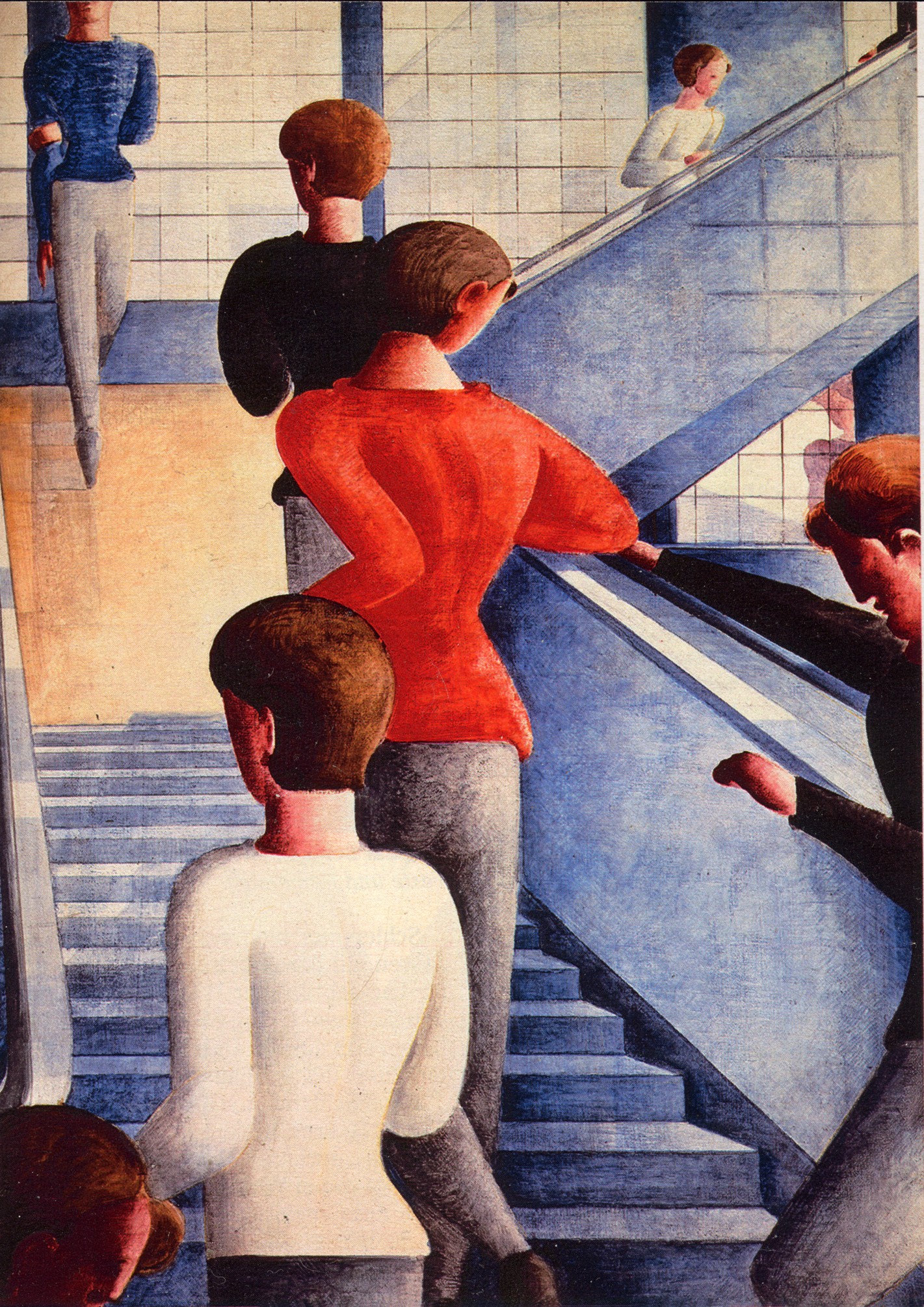
The album title was derived from the Oskar Schlemmer painting, Bauhaus Stairway (1932).

During 2020's COVID-19 lockdown in the United Kingdom, OMD frontman Andy McCluskey "rediscovered the creative power of total bloody boredom", writing the majority of what would become Bauhaus Staircase. This involved McCluskey penning music and lyrics to accompany various song title ideas he had accumulated, including "Bauhaus Staircase", "Kleptocracy", and "Anthropocene" (the album's original title). Bandmate Paul Humphreys noted that the record also features older tracks the group had previously struggled to complete. COVID restrictions meant that the duo had to work remotely, via the internet. Humphreys had recently become a father, which delayed his mixing of the album; rock producer David Watts was responsible for mixing "Kleptocracy" and "Slow Train".

Bauhaus Staircase was largely inspired by world politics during the late 2010s and early 2020s, being described by the band as their "most explicitly political record". In particular, "Kleptocracy" takes aim at leaders such as Donald Trump, Boris Johnson and Vladimir Putin. The title track pays homage to the Bauhaus art movement in pre-Nazi Germany. Elsewhere, "Anthropocene" and "Evolution of Species" deal with ecological themes, while "G.E.M." and "Aphrodite's Favourite Child" are personal songs written for figures in McCluskey's life. The Goldfrapp-inspired "Slow Train" features stream of consciousness-style lyrics penned in a similar fashion to those of 1991 hit, "Sailing on the Seven Seas". The album title is derived from the Oskar Schlemmer painting, Bauhaus Stairway (1932).

The release of Bauhaus Staircase – on 27 October 2023 – was preceded by three singles: the title track, "Slow Train", and "Veruschka". Kleptocracy was also later released as a single ahead of the start of the promotion tour for the album.

Artwork for the album was supplied by Liverpool-based artist John Petch. In April 2023, McCluskey stated that the next OMD album would "probably" be the band's last, although he described a potential future album as being one of collaborations with other artists.

== Reception ==
Professional ratings
Aggregate scores
| Source | Rating |
|---|---|
| Metacritic | 85/100 |
Review scores
| Source | Rating |
| Clash | 9/10 |
| Classic Pop | 4.5/5 stars |
| Gaffa | 5/6 stars |
| The Irish Times | 4/5 stars |
| L'Obs | 4/4 |
| Mojo | 4/5 stars |
| MusicOMH | 4/5 stars |
| PopMatters | 8/10 |
| Record Collector | 4/5 stars |
| Uncut | 8/10 |

Bauhaus Staircase met with positive reviews, being named "New Album of the Month" in Record Collector. Critic Dave Pollock wrote that it "is continued evidence that some recorded comebacks – this one, in particular – happen to be exactly the right thing for a group to do... It may occasionally sound warmly, comfortingly like the past, but this is an album with its mind fixed firmly on the future." Classic Pop awarded Bauhaus Staircase "Best New Release" honours in their November–December issue, with John Earls calling it "yet another stellar latter-period gem" that would make for "a hell of a last studio statement". Louder Than War's Martin Gray noted that OMD's "knack for crafting brilliant electronic pop tunes remains intact... each of the 12 tracks is perfectly executed, arranged and produced." According to Jason Anderson of Uncut, the band returned "with a new album as enthralling as anything they've recorded", striking "a balance between pristine electro-pop songcraft and the loopier inclinations that once fuelled [1983's] Dazzle Ships."

BrooklynVegan and The Irish Mail on Sunday each named Bauhaus Staircase their "Album of the Week", with the former's Bill Pearis calling it "one of [OMD's] best, certainly their most engaging, dialed-in record since 1984's Junk Culture." Pearis added that the album "pulls off that extremely tricky maneuver of going forward while reminding us of why we loved OMD in the first place." Matt Mitchell of Paste also highlighted Bauhaus Staircase as one of that week's finest releases, saying, "OMD's latest record is their best since Crush in 1985... the album is rife with synthesizers and drum machines that sound 40 years old and more timeless than ever." MusicOMH critic Ben Hogwood wrote that the band "remain in fine form... they still have plenty to give, plenty to say – and Bauhaus Staircase stands up there with the cream of their electronically harvested crop." Aggregator site Metacritic surveyed six reviews, generating a score of 85 out of 100.

Bauhaus Staircase was listed as one of 2023's best albums by multiple outlets. Physicist and musician Brian Cox described it as "superb" and the record that would be produced "if Kraftwerk came from the Wirral".

== Track listing ==
All songs by Andy McCluskey and Paul Humphreys, except where noted.

Bauhaus Staircase track listing
| No. | Title | Writer(s) | Length |
|---|---|---|---|
| 1. | "Bauhaus Staircase" | | 3:57 |
| 2. | "Anthropocene" | | 5:51 |
| 3. | "Look at You Now" | | 3:20 |
| 4. | "G.E.M." | McCluskey; Katrina Kanepe | 3:00 |
| 5. | "Where We Started" | McCluskey | 2:26 |
| 6. | "Veruschka" | | 3:33 |
| 7. | "Slow Train" | McCluskey; Kanepe | 3:58 |
| 8. | "Don't Go" | | 3:30 |
| 9. | "Kleptocracy" | McCluskey | 3:00 |
| 10. | "Aphrodite's Favourite Child" | McCluskey; George Geranios; Nikos Bitzenis | 3:29 |
| 11. | "Evolution of Species" | | 3:06 |
| 12. | "Healing" | McCluskey; Humphreys; Caroline England | 3:40 |
| Total length: | | | 42:50 |

== Personnel ==
Credits adapted from the liner notes of Bauhaus Staircase.

OMD

- OMD – production, engineering, recording
- Andy McCluskey – vocals, keyboards, bass guitar
- Paul Humphreys – keyboards, vocals
- Martin Cooper – keyboards
- Stuart Kershaw – drums

Additional personnel

- Ryan Artt – design
- Mike Marsh – mastering
- John Petch – artwork
- Atom™ – additional production and programming (on "Evolution of Species" and "Healing")
- David Watts – additional production (on "Aphrodite's Favourite Child" and "Healing"); mixing (on "Slow Train" and "Kleptocracy")
- David Watson – backing vocals (on "Look at You Now", "Where We Started" and "Veruschka"); choral effects (on "Anthropocene", "G.E.M." and "Evolution of Species")
- Katrina Kanepe – backing vocals (on "Slow Train")
- Caroline England – backing vocals (on "Healing")

== Charts ==
Chart performance for Bauhaus Staircase
| Chart (2023) | Peak position |
|---|---|
| Austrian Albums (Ö3 Austria) | 28 |
| Belgian Albums (Ultratop Flanders) | 62 |
| Belgian Albums (Ultratop Wallonia) | 64 |
| German Albums (Offizielle Top 100) | 7 |
| Irish Albums (IRMA) | 59 |
| Polish Albums (ZPAV) | 45 |
| Scottish Albums (Official Charts) | 2 |
| Swiss Albums (Schweizer Hitparade) | 38 |
| UK Albums (Official Charts) | 2 |
| UK Independent Albums (Official Charts) | 1 |
