= Triadisches Ballett =

Ballet written by Oskar Schlemmer

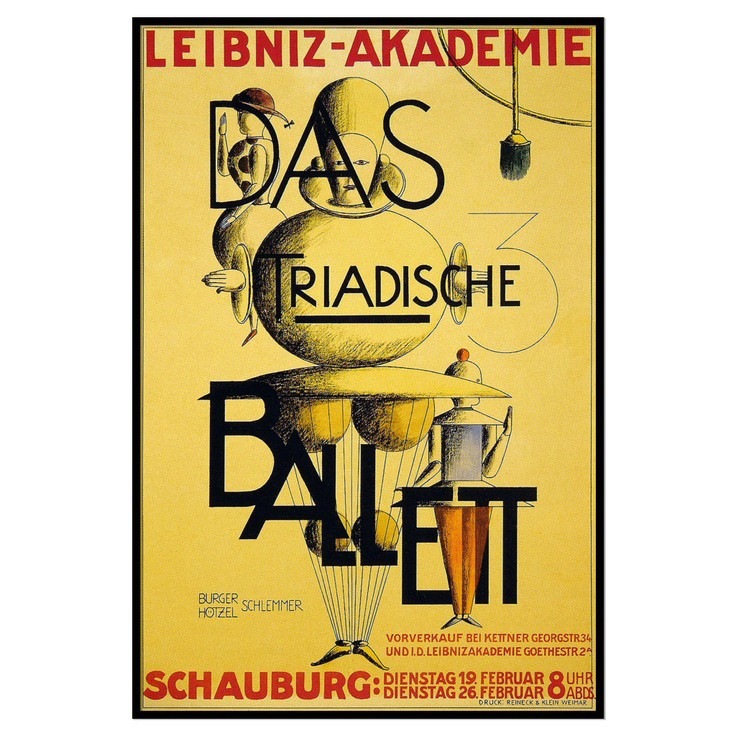
The Triadic Ballet. Poster for an unrealized performance in Hanover, February 19 + 26, 1924, designed by Oskar Schlemmer.

Triadisches Ballett (Triadic Ballet) is a ballet developed by Oskar Schlemmer. The ballet became the most widely performed avant-garde artistic dance and while Schlemmer was at the Bauhaus from 1921 to 1929, the ballet toured, helping to spread the ethos of the Bauhaus.

== History ==
The Triadisches Ballett was conceived in 1912 in Stuttgart in a cooperation between the dance troupe of Albert Burger (1884–1970) and his wife Elsa Hötzel (1886–1966) and Oskar Schlemmer. Parts of the ballet were performed in 1915, but though Burger asked Arnold Schoenberg to write the score ("Your music, which I know from the local concert, seemed to me to be the only one suitable for my ideas") he had no success so Schlemmer and the Burgers performed to music by Enrico Bossi. It premiered in the Stuttgart landestheater on 30 September 1922, with music composed by Paul Hindemith, re the Stuttgart Ballet. It was also performed in 1923 during the Bauhaus Week at the Nationaltheater, Weimar, and at the Annual Exhibition of German Crafts, Dresden.

== Synopsis ==
Inspired in part by Schoenberg's Pierrot Lunaire and his observations and experiences during the First World War, Oskar Schlemmer began to conceive of the human body as a new artistic medium. He saw ballet and pantomime as free from the historical baggage of theatre and opera and thus able to present his ideas of choreographed geometry, man as dancer, transformed by costume, moving in space.

The idea of the ballet was based on the principle of the trinity. It has 3 acts, 3 participants (2 male, 1 female), 12 dances and 18 costumes. Each act had a different colour and mood. The first three scenes, against a lemon yellow background to affect a cheerful, burlesque mood; the two middle scenes, on a pink stage, festive and solemn and the final three scenes, on black, were intended to be mystical and fantastic.

He saw the movement of puppets and marionettes as aesthetically superior to that of humans, as it emphasised that the medium of every art is artificial. This artifice could be expressed through stylised movements and the abstraction of the human body. His consideration of the human form (the abstract geometry of the body e.g. a cylinder for the neck, a circle for head and eyes) led to the all-important costume design, to create what he called his ‘figurine'. The music followed and finally the dance movements were decided.

Schlemmer saw the modern world driven by two main currents, the mechanised (man as machine and the body as a mechanism) and the primordial impulses (the depths of creative urges). He claimed that the choreographed geometry of dance offered a synthesis, the Dionysian and emotional origins of dance, becomes strict and Apollonian in its final form.

== Exhibitions ==
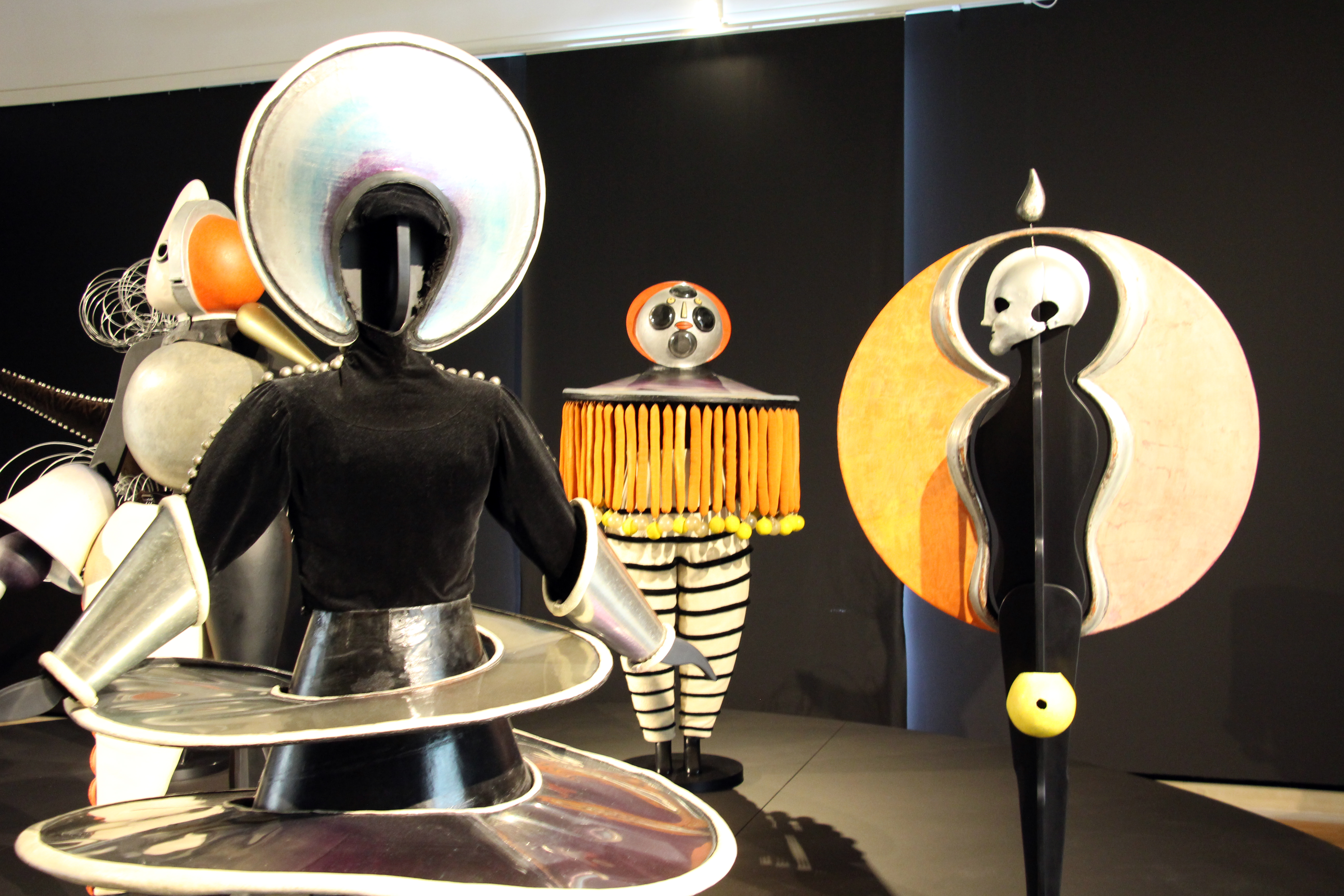
Costumes from Schlemmer's Triadisches Ballett (1922).

With the help and contribution of Schlemmer's friend Alf Bayrle the 'figurines' were also shown at a 1930 exhibition at the Societe des Arts Decoratifs in Paris, and again in 1938 at the Museum of Modern Art's Bauhaus exhibition in New York. The figurines were exhibited in stasis, without their choreography. Much later, Schlemmer's figurines appeared in the V&A's 2006 Modernism exhibition accompanied by video recordings of their movement. Some of Schlemmer's original costumes were preserved and can be seen at the Neue Staatsgalerie in Stuttgart, Germany.

== Related works ==
Oskar Schlemmer made many similar performance pieces, including his "Figural Cabinet" (1923), described as a ‘mechanical cabaret'; the Bauhaus “Fun Department” parties and festivals; Gesture dance, Hoop dance, Rod dance, Metal and Glass dances, and the futuristic "Men in Space."

== Film ==
Under the title Das triadische Ballett, the work was produced as a 30-minute color film in 1970 by Bavaria Atelier GmbH, with live-action dancers and new music by Erich Ferstl.
