= Merman (disambiguation) =

A merman is a half-man/half-fish from mythology.

Merman may also refer to:

== Music ==
- "Merman", a song by Tori Amos from the benefit album No Boundaries: A Benefit for the Kosovar Refugees
- Merman (album), a 1996 album by Emilíana Torrini

== People ==
- Ethel Merman (1908–1984), American actress and singer
- Varla Jean Merman, American drag queen

== Other uses ==
- Mer-Man, a character from the Masters of the Universe toy line
- "The Merman", a 1938 short story by L. Sprague de Camp
- Merman (company), a production company owned by Sharon Horgan
- Merman (horse), a racehorse
