= Sam Sallon =

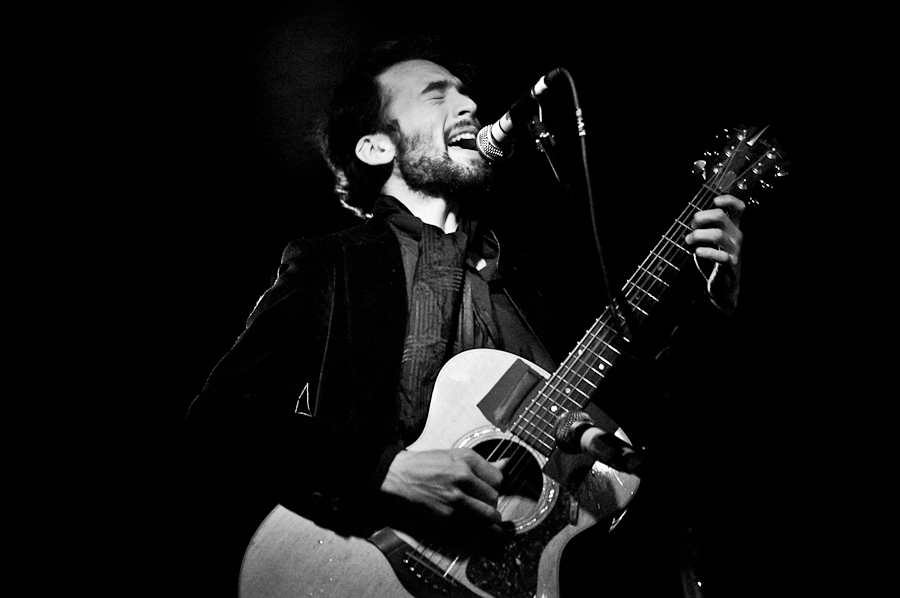
- Sam Sallon at The Troubadour, London 2012

Background information
- Born: 6 January 1980 (age 46); London, England
- Genres: Acoustic, folk rock
- Occupation: Singer-songwriter
- Instruments: Guitar, vocals
- Label: Indigo-Octagon
- Website: samsallon.com

Sam Sallon (born 6 January 1980) is an English musician, singer and songwriter. Born in London and raised in Manchester, he is the fourth child of eight. His first release Kathy's Song EP was released on Indigo-Octagon in January 2013, followed by the debut album One for the Road in September that year. In April 2014 Sallon picked up three awards at the Exposure Music Awards in London including Best Act Overall. In June 2014 he won an international Independent Music Award in the best Folk/Singer-songwriter category for his song "You Are Home". He has performed solo at the Royal Albert Hall opening for Pete Doherty, the Royal Festival Hall opening for Lyle Lovett and the Queen Elizabeth Hall opening for the Neil Cowley Trio. Other notable support slots have been with Lucy Rose, Johnny Flynn, Rodrigo y Gabriela, Nick Harper and Nouvelle Vague.

== Kathy's Song EP ==
Released in January 2013 Kathy's Song EP includes the title track, a cover of the 1965 Paul Simon song. The EP was received favourably, and the song received support from DJ Chris Hawkins at BBC 6music after Hawkins came to a gig in London, describing Sallon as "a special songwriter and captivating performer".

== One for the Road ==
One for the Road

Studio album by Sam Sallon
- Released: September 2013
- Label: Indigo-Octagon
- Producer: David Watson

Singles from One for the Road
- 1. "You May Not Mean To Hurt Me (But You Do)" Released: 25 March 2013; 2. "Long Way Down" Released: 27 May 2013

Recorded on and off during a period of two years with producer David Watson, the debut album One for the Road features among its musicians Neil Cowley, Paul Wassif and Kami Thompson from The Rails. The album was critically acclaimed, Mojo Magazine praising the album as "a finely crafted debut", and Maverick Magazine calling it "a potential album of the year". The singles "You May Not Mean To Hurt Me (But You Do)" and "Long Way Down" both received plays on BBC Radio 2 supported by DJs Dermot O'Leary and Clare Balding. British singer Lianne La Havas has expressed strong admiration for the album. The album cover was shot at Beachy Head by photographer Jean-Philippe Defaut.

== Discography ==
- Kathy's Song EP (2013)
- "You May Not Mean To Hurt Me (But You Do)" (single)
- "Long Way Down" (single)
- One for the Road (2013)
