= Me and Armini (song) =

Single by Emilíana Torrini

from the album Me and Armini
- Released: August 18, 2008
- Length: 4:18 (album version); 3:46 (radio edit)
- Label: Rough Trade
- Songwriters: Emilíana Torrini, Dan Carey
- Producer: Dan Carey

Emilíana Torrini singles chronology
"Heartstopper" (2005)	"Me and Armini" (2008)	"Big Jumps" (2008)

"Me and Armini" is first single lifted from Emilíana Torrini's third album Me and Armini. It was released as a digital download only on August 18, 2008 and later on September 1, 2008 as a limited to 500 copies 7" vinyl. The song is a live favourite on the tour supporting the Me and Armini album. It was also featured during the Emporio Armani Men's Collection Spring/Summer 2010 Fashion Show.

== Critical reception ==
The critics received "Me and Armini" rather warmly: Andrew Leahey of Allmusic said "the album's breezy title track" evokes "the reggae-tinged swagger of Lily Allen" while Amazon.co.uk's James Berry compared it to Gwen Stefani. Matthew Allard from ARTISTdirect wrote it "up[s] the tempo in a sunny, radio-ready way" and The Guardian's Maddy Costa called it "a scatty little attempt at dub that proves strangely affecting". PopMatters' reviewer Spencer Tricker was less impressed by the song, writing about it "declin[ing] attention excepting a vague, electro-dub feel and the titular refrain"

== Track listing ==
1. "Me and Armini" (radio edit) – 3:46
2. "Me and Armini" (Manasseh mix) – 5:09

== Release history ==
"Me and Armini" single
State	Date	Format
Worldwide	August 18, 2008	digital download
Worldwide	September 1, 2008	limited edition 7" vinyl

== Me and Armini EP ==
Me and Armini EP

EP by Emilíana Torrini
- Released: August 10, 2009
- Length: 13:36
- Label: Rough Trade

Emilíana Torrini chronology
Me and Armini (2008)	Me and Armini EP (2009)

Emilíana Torrini singles chronology
"Jungle Drum" (2009)	"Me and Armini" EP (2009)

Me and Armini EP is the first, and, digital only, EP by Emilíana Torrini. On Torrini's official website news about the then-forthcoming release of it showed up in July 2009. The official EP release dates are: August 10, 2009 in the United States and September 14^{A} the same year in the United Kingdom. The EP features two remixes of its title track and previously unreleased versions of "Ha Ha" and "Beggar's Prayer". All songs were featured in their original versions on the album Me and Armini.

^{A} Some sources give September 13 as the release date.

=== Music video ===
A music video was made for "Me and Armini", and was posted on Torrini's website on September 21, 2009. It utilizes the Dan Carey mix of the song.

=== Track listing ===
1. "Me and Armini" (Simone Lombardi mix) – 3:41
2. "Me and Armini" (Dan Carey mix) – 3:27
3. "Ha Ha" (KCRW.com Presents) – 3:06
4. "Beggar's Prayer" (KCRW.com Presents) – 3:22

=== Release history ===
Me and Armini EP
State	Date	Format
United States	August 10, 2009	digital download
United Kingdom	September 13, 2009	digital download
