= Crouçie d'où là =

Studio album by Emilíana Torrini
- Released: 1995
- Genres: Rock; blues; soul
- Label: JAPIS

Emilíana Torrini chronology
Spoon (1994)	Crouçie d'où là (1995)	Merman (1996)

Crouçie d'où là is the debut studio album by Icelandic singer-songwriter Emilíana Torrini. It was released in 1995 in Iceland by Japis records. The album consists entirely of cover songs. The title of the record is a play on words. It is spelled as if it were a French phrase, but it is a homonym of the Icelandic word Krúsídúlla which means cutie pie. The songs include "Crazy Love" written by Van Morrison, "I" written by the Japanese group Pizzicato Five and "Miss Celie's Blues" (from the movie The Color Purple).

Crouçie d'où là is currently out of print. When Emilíana was asked by a French fansite in a 2008 interview, she responded:

"No I really don't want it to. I have a funny relationship with that record and I guess I have disowned it in someways. My mum proudly took it out of the shelves at Christmas and played it to my boyfriend. I hadn't heard it since I recorded it. It was too painful... I didn't like it. She laughed. He blushed."

As of 2009, the album sold 15,000 units in Iceland.

== Track listing ==
1. "I'm a Bad Luck Woman" (Memphis Minnie)
2. "Crazy Love" (Van Morrison)
3. "The Man with the Golden Gun" (Don Black, John Barry)
4. "Today I Sing the Blues" (Curtis Reginald Lewis & Jack Hammer [aka Earl Solomon Burroughs])
5. "I" (Pizzicato Five, Yasuharu Konishi)
6. "The Dirty Dozen" (J. Mayo Williams & Rufus George "Speckled Red" Perryman)
7. "Tomorrow" (Paul Williams)
8. "Find It" (Igo Kantor & Stu Phillips)
9. "Miss Celie's Blues" (Quincy Jones, Rod Temperton & Lionel Richie)
10. "Aaaa..." (V.G. Friðriksson Brekkan)

== Band members ==
- Emilíana Torrini – vocals
- Jón Ólafsson – piano, vibraphone
- Jóhann Hjörleifsson – drums, percussions, marimba
- Guðmundur Pétursson – guitar
- Sigurður Sigurðsson – munnharpa
- Róbert Þorhalsson – double bass, electric bass
- Haraldur Þorsteinsson – bass on tracks 2, 4, 6 & 9
- Snorri Valsson – trumpet
- Magnús Jónsson – tap dance
