= Bauhaus Stairway =

1932 painting by Oskar Schlemmer

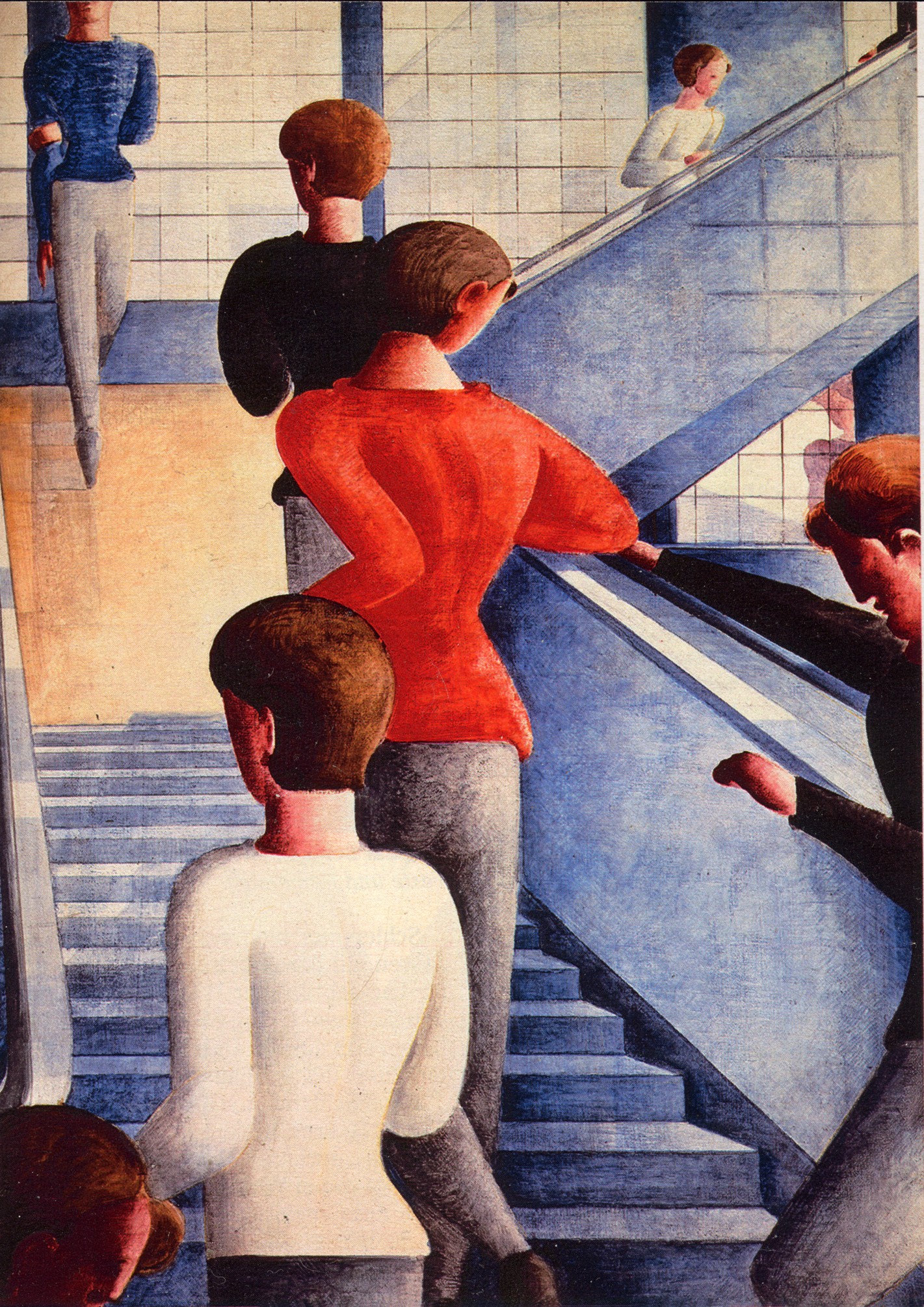
- Artist: Oskar Schlemmer
- Year: 1932
- Medium: Oil on canvas
- Movement: Bauhaus
- Dimensions: 162.3 cm × 114.3 cm (63.9 in × 45.0 in)
- Location: Museum of Modern Art, New York
- Accession: 597.1942

Bauhaus Stairway, or in German, Bauhaustreppe, is an oil painting by German artist Oskar Schlemmer, completed in 1932. It depicts the Bauhaus school, a German art school that closed in 1933, due to the Nazis' taking power. It is on display at the Museum of Modern Art, in New York. The portrait depicts students ascending the stairs at the Bauhaus school, with all but one walking away from the viewer.

English electronic band OMD adapted the title of the painting for their 2023 studio album, Bauhaus Staircase.
