= Thomas Bayrle =

German sculptor, painter, graphic artist and video artist

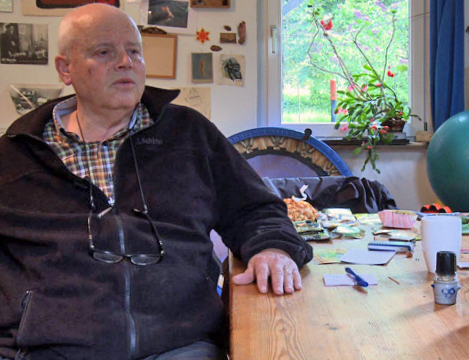
- Bayrle in the film The Future of Art (2010)
- Born: 7 November 1937 (age 88); Berlin, Germany
- Occupations: Sculptor; painter; graphic artist; video artist
- Spouse: Helke Bayrle (died 2022)
- Parent(s): Alf Bayrle; Elisabeth Weiss
- Awards: Hessian Cultural Prize (1998); Goethe Plaque of the City of Frankfurt (2007)

Thomas Bayrle (born 7 November 1937) is a German sculptor, painter, graphic artist, and video artist. He is known for being a pop artist.

== Life ==
Thomas Bayrle was born on 7 November 1937 in Berlin. He is the son of the painter and graphic artist Alf Bayrle and the art historian Elisabeth Weiss.

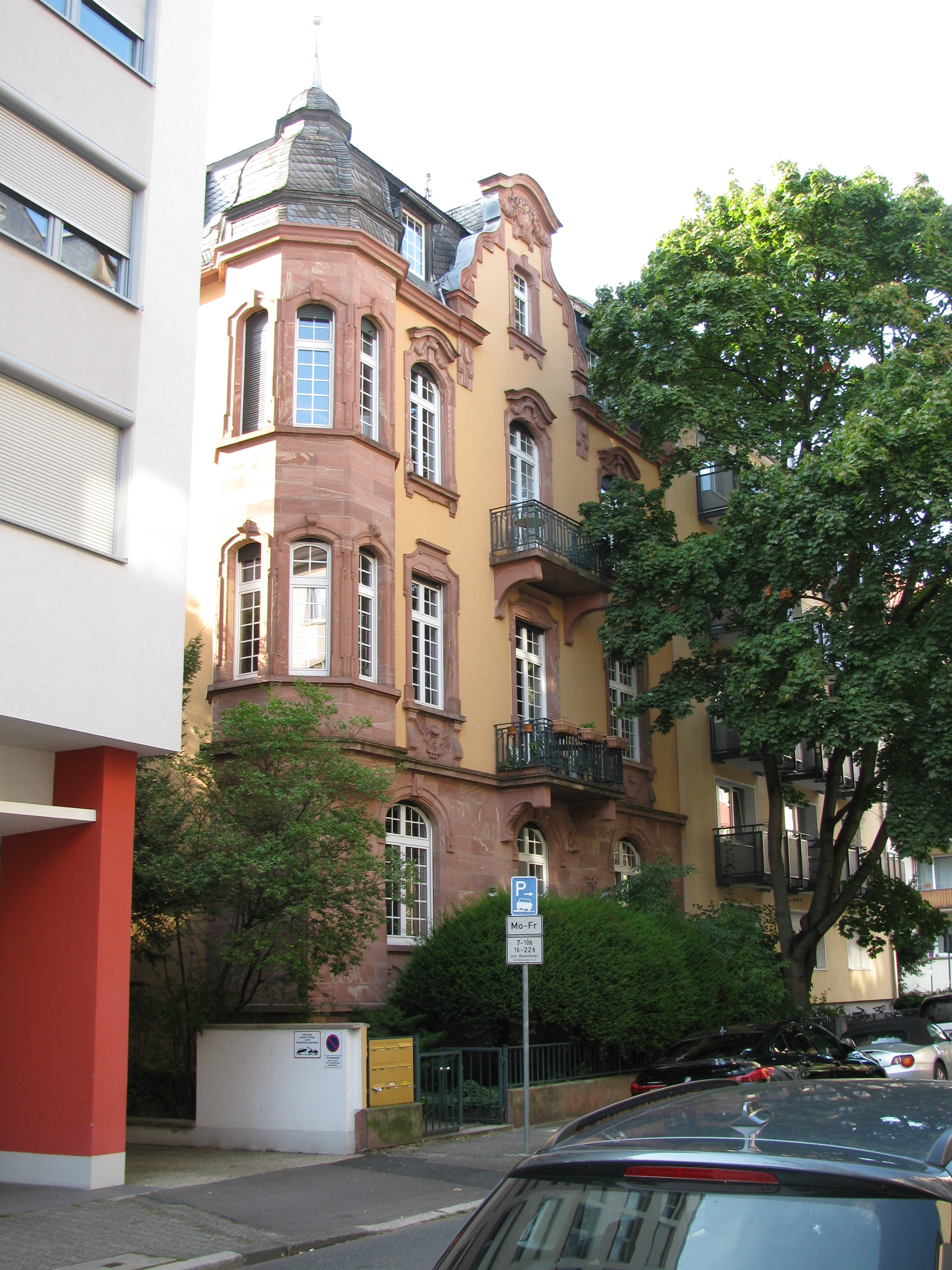
Bayrle & Kellermann – The Makers of Display, 1969–1972, Frankfurt, Telemannstraße 5

Bayrle wanted to become a textile engineer, and completed a two-year apprenticeship as a pattern designer and weaver in 1956. While working on Jacquard looms in Göppingen, Bayrle became inspired by the machine's rhythmic sound and the repetitive patterns of the fabric.

From 1958 to 1961, Bayrle studied at the Werkkunstschule Offenbach. Initially, he wanted to study commercial art, but he turned to printmaking and learned the technique of lithography and etching from Eberhard Behr.

In 1961, he founded the Gulliver Press together with Bernhard Jäger and made a name for himself as a printer and publisher of artists' books. One of the first books by Ernst Jandl (Hosi-Anna! 1965) appeared in the Gulliver Press – illustrated by Thomas Bayrle and Bernhard Jäger.

In 1964, Bayrle appeared in documenta III, in 1977 in documenta 6 and in 2012 in dOCUMENTA (13) in Kassel.

From 1969 to 1972, Bayrle ran a creative studio with Hans Jörg Kellermann in Frankfurt's Westend, which produced three-dimensional objects as Bayrle & Kellermann – The Makers of Display, which oscillated between art and advertising, and also ran a screen printing workshop. Clients included the chocolate manufacturer Ferrero SpA, the carpet brand Enkalon, the fashion designer Pierre Cardin and the trade union bank BfG.

From 1972 to 2002, Bayrle taught at the Städelschule in Frankfurt. His students included Haegue Yang, Jana Euler, Tomas Saraceno, Martin Liebscher, Marko Lehanka, Georg Peez, Manfred Stumpf, Kerstin Jeckel and Stefan Müller. In 1995 he held a visiting professorship at Tohoku University in Japan. In 2002 he retired.

Bayrle was married to the artist Helke Bayrle (1941–2022). Thomas Bayrle lives and works in Frankfurt.

== Work ==
Bayrle's work is characterized by his fascination with grids and repetition. His subject matter includes the position of the individual within socio-political, industrial, and technological regimes. By reflecting on a world of goods as an accumulation of multipliable, repeatable forms and pictograms, Bayrle not only provides a commentary on society, but also refers to his own artistic means. Bayrle's influences include pop art, Sigmar Polke, the Frankfurt School, the post-war economic boom, and the Americanization of Frankfurt.

Bayrle's signature style is what he calls a "superform": an image made from a composite of many repeated images.

Bayrle was among the first German artists to produce computer-generated and animated art.

== Exhibitions ==
Bayrle has had solo exhibitions in Düsseldorf, Montreal, Cologne, Graz, Frankfurt, Vienna, Venice, Auckland, Berlin, Duisburg, Geneva, Karlsruhe, New York, Zürich and Austin/Texas.

Bayrle's works are represented in museums, public and private collections. In 1984, he took part in From Here – Two Months of New German Art in Düsseldorf. In 2002, he had an exhibition at the Städel Museum in Frankfurt .

In 2005 and 2006, Bayrle took part in exhibitions at the Center for Art and Media Technology, Karlsruhe, the Kunstmuseum Thun, the Kunsthaus Zürich, the Museum für Moderne Kunst (MMK), Frankfurt, and the Kunsthalle Fridericianum, Kassel. In 2007 Bayrle exhibited at the Fonds Régional d'Art Contemporain Limousin (FRAC), Limoges and at the Office for Contemporary Art, Oslo. In 2008, he was a participant in the Biennale of Sydney (Art Gallery of New South Wales). In 2009 a major retrospective exhibition was held at the Museu d'Art Contemporani de Barcelona (MACBA) in Barcelona. In 2012, he took part in the dOCUMENTA (13) in Kassel. Bayrle documented his examination of the Christian faith in 2014 with a selection of his works in the exhibition catholic in the Kunst-Station Sankt Peter Cologne and in the exhibition Agnus Dei in the St. Matthäus-Kirche at the Kulturforum Berlin.

For the 2003/2004 season at the Vienna State Opera, he designed a huge painting (176 m^{2}) as part of the "Iron Curtain" exhibition series conceived by museum in progress.

In his solo exhibition 'If something is too long – make it longer' at the Vienna Museum of Applied Arts (MAK), Bayrle combined traditional manual techniques with computer-generated art of the information age for the 2017/18 season. Significant new productions were also created for the exhibition, including the installation iPhone meets Japan, a walk-in scene with which Bayrle reflected a Japanese Shunga from the MAK's Asia collection in a "super form" made of iPhones.

Since March 2018, the Municipal Gallery in the Lenbachhaus and Kunstbau in Munich has been showing some of the artist's futuristic compositions. As part of the exhibition, I'm a Believer. Pop Art and contemporary art from the Lenbachhaus and the KiCo Foundation will present the large-format sculpture "Autostrada" (2003) and other graphic wall panels from the collection.

== Awards ==
- 1970: Prize of the Second British International Print Biennale, Bradford
- 1971: Stipendium Villa Massimo, Rome
- 1995: Preis der Ars Electronica in Linz
- 1997: Binding-Kulturpreis der Binding-Kulturstiftung, Frankfurt
- 1998: Hessian Cultural Prize, Wiesbaden
- 2000: KUNSTKÖLN-Preis (from 2006: Cologne-Fine-Art-Preis)
- 2007: Goethe Plaque of the City of Frankfurt
- 2012: Arnold-Bode-Preis
