= Mark Abis =

British singer-songwriter and musician

Mark Abis is an English singer-songwriter and musician. His album Changing Inside, produced by Eg White was released on 13 June 2005 on the Serpent label.

Nick Drake's record producer Joe Boyd became interested in the album and reviewed it saying: 'Going back to the mid-Sixties, I have heard more than any one man's share of singer-songwriters. So it takes a lot to get my attention. His melodies are original, his vocals warm and distinctive, a real musical sensibility is obvious, with literary lyrics to boot. My vote for one of the best of the new generation'.

His song "Summerbreeze" has enjoyed several releases, and was recorded by Emiliana Torrini for her album, Love in the Time of Science. "Summerbreeze" has been featured on television programmes including Brothers & Sisters, Secret Diary of a Call Girl, and Buffy the Vampire Slayer. The song was included on the 2003 official soundtrack album Buffy the Vampire Slayer: Radio Sunnydale.

His song "For a Woman's Love" was featured on the television programme Eli Stone.

In 2015, Abis signed to Joe Boyd's publishing company Carthage Music to release the new work.

Abis tours in the UK and Europe and has new work awaiting release.

Abis is also a member of Blues/Folk trio Three Pilgrims with Paul Wassif and David Watson.

== Discography ==
Changing Inside

Studio album by Mark Abis
- Released: 13 June 2005
- Label: Serpent Sounds
- Producer: Eg White

- Changing Inside (2005)

Track Listing:

1. "Summerbreeze"
2. "Memory"
3. "For a Woman's Love"
4. "Dream Come True"
5. "Heaven is Your Face"
6. "Steppin' Out"
7. "Changing Inside"
8. "Through the Heart of New York"
9. "Stronger Than Desire"
10. "Already There"
11. "Pink Tulips"

== "Summerbreeze" covers and compilation credits ==
- Love in the Time of Science – Emiliana Torrini – (2000)
- Musique de Nuit Vol 5 – Compilation, Virgin/Labels France (2000)
- Meter Sessies Vol 10 – Compilation, Universal Holland (2001)
- Chilled – Compilation, Hot Tickets/Associated Newspapers Ltd (2002)
- The Late Lounge – Compilation, Jazz FM Records (2002)
- Buffy the Vampire Slayer: Radio Sunnydale (2003 Original Soundtrack release)
