= Jungle Drum =

2009 single by Emilíana Torrini

Single by Emilíana Torrini

from the album Me and Armini
- B-side: "Me and Armini"
- Released: 9 March 2009
- Genre: Indie pop
- Length: 2:14
- Label: Rough Trade
- Songwriters: Emilíana Torrini; Dan Carey
- Producer: Dan Carey

Emilíana Torrini singles chronology
"Big Jumps" (2008)	"Jungle Drum" (2009)	"Me and Armini" (2009)

"Jungle Drum" is the third single released from Icelandic singer-songwriter Emilíana Torrini's third studio album, Me and Armini. It was released as a digital download on 9 March 2009 and later on 19 June 2009 as a CD single in Germany.

== Critical reception ==
Critics received the song very warmly; Popmatters' reviewer Spencer Tricker called "Jungle Drum" the "catchiest tune" on the album (alongside "Big Jumps"), "every bit as good as the singles from Fisherman's Woman". He also praised the song for boasting "an irresistible chorus that features some totally unexpected scatting". Matthew Allard from ARTISTdirect stated the song "should be an iPhone ad". Clickmusic reviewer Francis Jolley called the song "a sprightly, fun little gem, reminiscent of Nancy Sinatra in her heyday" and "infectious Scandinavian pop". Both Popmatters and Clickmusic reviews praised the song's rhythm section calling it impossible "to not foot tap along" to.

== Appearances in media ==
In 2009 it also appeared in the Germany's Next Topmodel TV show. Thus, the song became very popular in German-speaking countries. It was planned to appear in the dance video game Just Dance 3 but it did not appear for unknown reasons.

In 2010 the track was used as a theme song in a video made for the Government of Iceland's official campaign "Inspired by Iceland" to lure tourists to visit Iceland.

In 2024, the track was used in the trailer for the film, Seize Them!

== Track listings ==
Digital download

1. "Jungle Drum" — 2:13

German CD single

1. "Jungle Drum" — 2:13
2. "Me and Armini" — 4:17

== Chart performance ==
The song debuted on the German Singles Chart at number 12 and peaked at number one on its fourth week, where it stayed for eight consecutive weeks. It stayed on that chart for a total of 35 weeks. The song also reached number one in Austria and Flanders.

=== Weekly charts ===
Chart (2009–2014)	Peak position
Australia (ARIA)	76
Austria (Ö3 Austria Top 40)	1
Belgium (Ultratop 50 Flanders)	1
Belgium (Ultratip Bubbling Under Wallonia)	5
Czech Republic Airplay (ČNS IFPI)	37
Europe (Eurochart Hot 100)	5
Finland (Suomen virallinen lista)	5
Germany (GfK)	1
Israel (Media Forest)	7
Netherlands (Single Top 100)	57
Spain (Promusicae)	14
Switzerland (Schweizer Hitparade)	11

=== Year-end charts ===
Chart (2009)	Position
Austria (Ö3 Austria Top 40)	2
Belgium (Ultratop 50 Flanders)	11
Europe (Eurochart Hot 100)	32
Germany (Media Control GfK)	2
Switzerland (Schweizer Hitparade)	40

=== Decade-end charts ===
Chart (2000–2009)	Position
Germany (Media Control GfK)	25

== Certifications ==
Region	Certification	Certified units/sales
Belgium (BRMA)	Gold	
Germany (BVMI)	Platinum	300,000^{^}
^{^} Shipments figures based on certification alone.

== Release history ==
State	Date	Format
Worldwide	9 March 2009	digital download
Germany	19 June 2009	CD single

== Covers ==
- In 2009, the song had been covered by German band The Baseballs and is featured on their cover album Strike! Back!.
- In 2009, Austrian hip hop artist Chakuza sampled the song on his free track "Jungle Drum Mix".
- In 2019, German metal band Emil Bulls released the song on their cover album called "Mixtape".
