= Sunnyroad =

Single by Emilíana Torrini

from the album Fisherman's Woman
- Released: 14 February 2005
- Genre: Indie pop, pop-folk
- Label: Rough Trade
- Songwriter(s): Emilíana Torrini, Dan Carey

Emilíana Torrini singles chronology
"Lifesaver" (2004)	"Sunnyroad" (2005)	"Heartstopper" (2005)

"Sunnyroad" is the second single for the Fisherman's Woman record, released by Emiliana Torrini in 2005. It reached number 82 on the UK Singles Chart.

== Track listing ==
1. "Sunnyroad" (album version)
2. "Sunnyroad" (radio version)
3. "Sunnyroad" (Manasseh mix)
4. "Sunnyroad" (Atom TM's Future Folk mix)
5. "Sunnyroad" (music video)

== Charts ==
Chart performance for "Sunnyroad"
Chart (2005)	Peak position
UK Singles (OCC)	82
