= Rarities (Emilíana Torrini album) =

Compilation album by Emilíana Torrini
- Released: 2000
- Label: One Little Indian

Emilíana Torrini chronology
Love in the Time of Science (1999)	Rarities (2000)	Fisherman's Woman (2005)

Rarities is a compilation album by Icelandic singer-songwriter Emilíana Torrini, released in 2000.

== Track listing ==
1. "Weird Friendless Kid"
2. "If You Go Away" (an adaptation of Jacques Brel's song "Ne me quitte pas")
3. "7-Up Days"
4. "Flirt"
5. "Tuna Fish" (acoustic version)
6. "Baby Blue" (Rae & Christian remix)
7. "Easy" (remix)
8. "Unemployed in Summertime" (remix)
9. "To Be Free" (Future Shock mix)

== Critical reception ==
Professional ratings
Review scores
Source	Rating
AllMusic	3.5/5 stars

Jamie Gill of BBC said the songs on Rarities sounded out of date because of the downtempo songwriting. Alternatively, Ned Raggett of AllMusic said the album was a good way to introduce people to Torrini's older music of the 1990s.
