= Love in the Time of Science =

Studio album by Emilíana Torrini
- Released: 22 November 1999 (UK); 24 October 2000 (US)
- Recorded: Neptune's Kitchen (addt. recording in Spain and Iceland)
- Genres: Electronica; trip hop
- Length: 38:54
- Labels: One Little Indian; Virgin
- Producers: Roland Orzabal; Alan Griffiths

Emilíana Torrini chronology
Merman (1996)	Love in the Time of Science (1999)	Rarities (2000)

Alternative cover
- Original cover

Professional ratings
Review scores
Source	Rating
AllMusic	4/5 stars
PopMatters	(positive)

Love in the Time of Science is the third studio album by Icelandic singer and songwriter Emilíana Torrini. It was her first album to be released internationally (her earlier albums being released only in her native Iceland).

The album was recorded and released in 1999, and was produced by Roland Orzabal and Alan Griffiths of Tears for Fears, who also wrote two tracks for the album. It was recorded and mixed at Orzabal's own studio, Neptune's Kitchen, with additional recording done in Spain and Iceland. Orzabal also played and performed backing vocals on the album.

Other collaborators included Eg White, Jóhann Jóhannsson, Siggi Baldursson and Mark Abis.

The title of the album is a variation of the 1985 Gabriel García Márquez novel Love in the Time of Cholera. The song "Telepathy" was originally called "Love in the Time of Science" written by the Icelandic band Dip whom Torrini had previously worked with (Torrini sang on Dip's original version of the song, and Dip members Jóhann Jóhannsson and Sigtryggur Baldursson also appear on this album). The song would later be recorded under its original title by Marc Almond for his 2001 album Stranger Things, which was produced by Jóhannsson.

== Track listing ==
No.	Title	Writer(s)	Length
1.	"To Be Free"	Emilíana Torrini, Eg White	3:25
2.	"Wednesday's Child"	Roland Orzabal, Alan Griffiths	3:54
3.	"Baby Blue"	Orzabal, Griffiths	4:05
4.	"Dead Things"	Torrini, White	4:25
5.	"Unemployed in Summertime"	Torrini, White	3:46
6.	"Easy"	Torrini, White, Siggi Baldursson	3:22
7.	"Fingertips"	Torrini, White, Baldursson	3:43
8.	"Telepathy"	Baldursson, Johann G Johannsson	4:01
9.	"Tuna Fish"	Torrini, White, Baldursson	3:13
10.	"Summerbreeze"	Mark Abis	3:48
11.	"Sea People"	Torrini, White	1:12

== Singles ==
- "Dead Things"
- "Baby Blue"
- "To Be Free" (UK #44)
- "Easy" (UK #63)
- "Unemployed in Summertime" (UK #63)

== FatCat remixes ==
A series of remixes of the songs from Love in the Time of Science were released by FatCat Records, as free 128 kBps mp3s on the site www.e-rmx.com (now discontinued), and as a set of eight 7 inch singles. The singles were titled sequentially, E1 to E8.

The songs were remixed by Grain, Process, Mice Parade, V/Vm, Múm, Smith & Ludlow, Stromba, Antenna Farm, Motion, Lucky Kitchen, Team Doyobi, Foehn, Chasm, Immense, Fonn, Di Lacuna and Transient Waves.
