= Neil Cowley =

English pianist and composer

- Born: 5 November 1972 (age 53); London, England
- Instrument: Piano
- Label: Hide Inside

Neil Cowley (born 5 November 1972) is an English contemporary pianist and composer. He has also released music as part of Fragile State, the Green Nuns of the Revolution, and the Neil Cowley Trio. With his trio, he appeared on Later... with Jools Holland in April 2008 and won the 2007 BBC Jazz Award for best album for Displaced. In 2018, Cowley announced he was working on a new electronic focused solo project. In 2020, Cowley announced his debut solo album, Hall of Mirrors.

== Biography ==
Cowley was born in London, England. He began as a classical pianist and performed a Shostakovich piano concerto at the age of 10 at Queen Elizabeth Hall. In his late teens Cowley moved into being a keyboardist for soul and funk acts Mission Impossible, the Brand New Heavies, Gabrielle and Zero 7. He also appeared as a co-composer and session musician with the jazz-rock group Samuel Purdey. An early album was Foxbury Rules, released under the pseudonym Diamond Wookie.

In 2002, he formed the duo Fragile State with Ben Mynott; after its end, the Neil Cowley Trio. In 2006, he released an album called Soundcastles under the name Pretz.

In 2008, the Neil Cowley Trio recorded cover versions of the Beatles' "Revolution 1" and "Revolution 9" for Mojo magazine. In 2012, he appeared as the session pianist on Adele's album 21.

In 2013, he was Musician in Residence for Derry, when it was designated the inaugural UK City of Culture.

On 16 September 2016, the album Spacebound Apes was released by Neil Cowley Trio.

In 2018, Cowley announced that the trio was on hiatus and he was working on a new electronic focused project. The trio reunited in 2024 to release an album "Entity" which has been supported by UK and European tour dates in 2024 and 2025.

== Discography ==
=== Solo albums ===
Diamond Wookie

- Foxbury Rules (1997)

Pretz

- Soundcastles (2006)

Neil Cowley

- Hall of Mirrors (2021)
- Battery Life (2023)
- Fragmented Recall (2023)
- Battery: Live (2023)

=== Solo EPs ===
Neil Cowley

- Grains & Motes (2019)
- Beat Infinitum (2019)
- Building Blocks, Pt. 1 (2020)
- Building Blocks, Pt. 2 (2020)
- Building Blocks, Pt. 3 (2020)
- Building Blocks, Pt. 4 (2022)
- Building Blocks, Pt. 5 (2022)
- Myna Cycles (2022)
- Building Blocks, Pt. 6 (2024)

=== As leader/co-leader ===
With Green Nuns of the Revolution

- Rock Bitch Mafia (1997)

Fragile State

- Nocturnal Beats (2001)
- The Facts and the Dreams (2003)
- Voices From The Dust Bowl (2004)

Neil Cowley Trio

- Displaced (2006)
- Loud... Louder... Stop! (2008)
- Radio Silence (2010)
- The Face of Mount Molehill (2012)
- Touch and Flee (2014)
- Live at Montreux 2012 (2013)
- Spacebound Apes (2016)
- Spacebound Tapes (2018)
- Entity (2024)
- Built On Bach (2026)

=== As sideman ===
- Zero 7 - When It Falls (2004)
- Adele - 19 (2008)
- Stereophonics - Keep Calm and Carry On (2009)
- Adele - 21 (2011)
- Birdy - Birdy (2011)
- Professor Green - At Your Inconvenience (2011)
- Emeli Sandé - Our Version of Events (2012)
- Sam Sallon - One for the Road (2013)
- Birdy - Fire Within (2013)
- Mark Abis - China Ship (2020)
- Polly Paulusma - Wildfires (2025)
