= Tookah =

Studio album by Emilíana Torrini
- Released: 6 September 2013
- Recorded: 2011–2013
- Genres: Indie pop; folk; acoustic
- Label: Rough Trade
- Producer: Dan Carey

Emilíana Torrini chronology
| Me and Armini (2008) | Tookah (2013) |

Tookah is the sixth studio album recorded by Icelandic singer-songwriter Emilíana Torrini. It was produced by Dan Carey over three years, from late 2011 to summer 2013. The album was released in September 2013.

== Promotion ==
On 3 June 2013, Torrini revealed that her new album was titled Tookah. Torrini played a number of music festivals in the lead up to the album's release in Russia and Budapest. The first single, "Speed of Dark", was released in summer 2013, with a music video by Brazilian director Guilherme Marcondes. The album was released by Rough Trade.

== Album release ==
The album was made available for pre-order on July 29, 2013. This pre-order offer provided fans with the opportunity to download the first promotional track from the album, titled "Speed of Dark". Additionally, fans had the option to pre-order a special version of the album directly from the record label Rough Trade in the UK, US, Germany, and Austria.

== Critical reception ==
Professional ratings
Aggregate scores
| Source | Rating |
|---|---|
| Metacritic | 71/100 |
Review scores
| Source | Rating |
| Allmusic | 4/5 stars |
| Clash | 9/10 |
| musicOMH | 4/5 stars |
| PopMatters | 5/10 |

Tookah received positive reviews from music critics. On Metacritic, which assigns a normalised rating out of 100 to reviews from mainstream critics, the album received an average score of 71, based on 12 reviews, indicating "generally favorable reviews". Gemma Hampson of Clash magazine praised the album's production, writing that "There's something magical and mystical about 'Tookah'. A thread of electro runs through these nine tracks, introducing a whole new musical landscape to this singer's stunningly beautiful songs. (...) Every track gives you something new and exciting, while holding tightly on to Emilíana's flawless voice and melodies."

== Track listing ==
| No. | Title | Length |
|---|---|---|
| 1. | "Tookah" | 3:00 |
| 2. | "Caterpillar" | 3:52 |
| 3. | "Autumn Sun" | 4:11 |
| 4. | "Home" | 3:34 |
| 5. | "Elísabet" | 3:28 |
| 6. | "Animal Games" | 2:56 |
| 7. | "Speed of Dark" | 5:37 |
| 8. | "Blood Red" | 5:07 |
| 9. | "When Fever Breaks" | 7:29 |

Deluxe edition bonus tracks
| No. | Title | Length |
|---|---|---|
| 10. | "Echo Horse (History of Horses)" |

== Charts ==
| Chart (2013) | Peak position |
|---|---|
| Belgian Albums (Ultratop Flanders) | 69 |
| Belgian Albums (Ultratop Wallonia) | 42 |
| Dutch Albums (Album Top 100) | 91 |
| French Albums (SNEP) | 44 |
| German Albums (Offizielle Top 100) | 51 |
| Scottish Albums (Official Charts) | 98 |
| Swiss Albums (Schweizer Hitparade) | 36 |
| UK Albums (Official Charts) | 86 |
| UK Independent Albums (Official Charts) | 18 |

== Release history ==
| Region | Date | Label | Format |
|---|---|---|---|
| Austria | 6 September 2013 | Rough Trade | CD, digital download |
| Germany | 6 September 2013 | Rough Trade | CD, digital download |
| Ireland | 6 September 2013 | Rough Trade | CD, digital download |
| Netherlands | 6 September 2013 | Rough Trade | CD, digital download |
| Australia | 9 September 2013 | Rough Trade | CD, digital download |
| Canada | 9 September 2013 | Rough Trade | CD, digital download |
| France | 9 September 2013 | Rough Trade | CD, digital download |
| New Zealand | 9 September 2013 | Rough Trade | CD, digital download |
| Poland | 9 September 2013 | Rough Trade | CD, LP, digital download |
| Spain | 9 September 2013 | Rough Trade | CD, digital download |
| Switzerland | 9 September 2013 | Rough Trade | CD, digital download |
| United Kingdom | 9 September 2013 | Rough Trade | CD, digital download |
| United States | 10 September 2013 | Rough Trade | CD, digital download |
