= Heartstopper (song) =

Single by Emilíana Torrini

from the album Fisherman's Woman
- B-side: "Thinking Out Loud" (extended horn section version)
- Released: 25 March 2005
- Genre: Indie pop, indie folk
- Label: Rough Trade Records
- Songwriters: Emilíana Torrini, Dan Carey

Emilíana Torrini singles chronology
"Sunnyroad" (2005)	"Heartstopper" (2005)	"Me and Armini" (2008)

"Heartstopper" is a song by Emilíana Torrini, released as the third promotional release from her Fisherman's Woman album in 2005. It was released as a 7" vinyl single, enhanced CD single and promo CD single. It reached number 126 on the UK Singles Chart.

== Track listing ==
1. "Heartstopper" (radiofied version)
2. "Thinking Out Loud" (extended horn section version)
3. "Heartstopper" (stop Hearting mix by múm)
4. "Heartstopper" (album version)
5. "Heartstopper" (video)
