= Mermans =

Mermans is a Dutch surname. Notable people with the surname include:

- Jef Mermans, Belgian footballer
- Lien Mermans, Belgian footballer
