= Johannes Meerman =

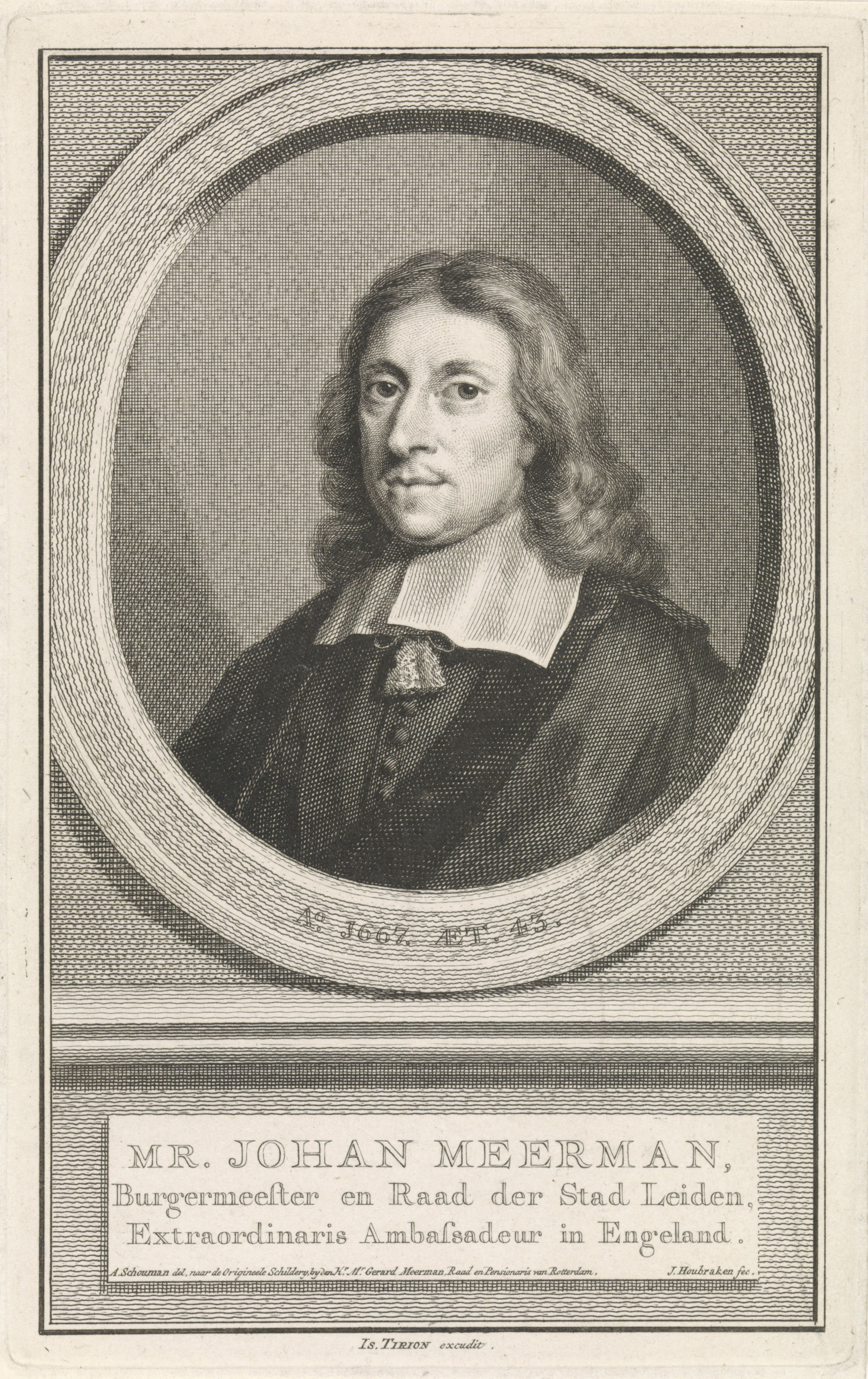
- Portrait of Johannes Meerman by Jacobus Houbraken
- Born: 1624
- Died: 1675 (aged 50–51)

Johannes Meerman (1624 – 1675) was a Dutch Golden Age mayor of Leiden who was a friend and assistant to Johan de Witt.

He was ambassador to England in 1667 where he helped close the Triple Alliance with England and Sweden. He commissioned a family portrait from the painter Pieter Cornelisz van Slingelandt that hangs in the Louvre.

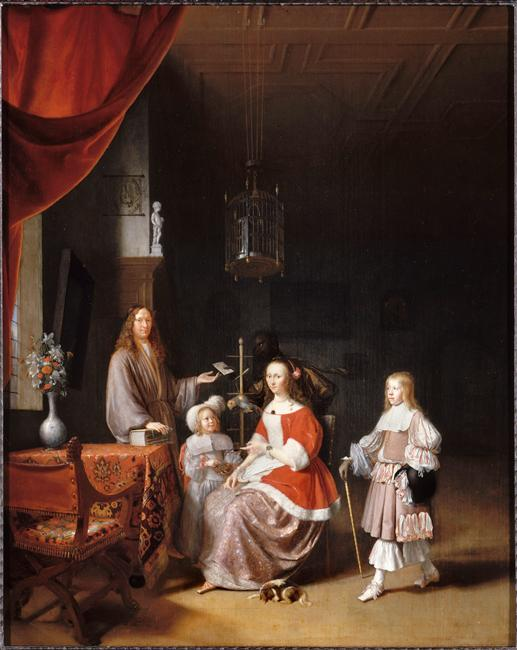
Family portrait of Johannes Meerman
