= Me and Armini =

Studio album by Emilíana Torrini
- Released: September 8, 2008
- Genres: Indie pop; psychedelic rock
- Label: Rough Trade
- Producer: Dan Carey

Emilíana Torrini chronology
Fisherman's Woman (2005)	Me and Armini (2008)	Tookah (2013)

Singles from Me and Armini
- 1. "Me and Armini" Released: August 19, 2008; 2. "Big Jumps" Released: October 13, 2008; 3. "Jungle Drum" Released: March 9, 2009

Me and Armini is the fifth (third released outside Iceland) studio album by the Icelandic singer and songwriter Emilíana Torrini. It was produced by Dan Carey, and released on September 8, 2008. The album spawned three singles: "Me and Armini", "Big Jumps" and "Jungle Drum".

== Promotion ==
The release of the album was preceded by the lead single "Me and Armini", released as a digital download on August 19, 2008. The second single from the album, "Big Jumps", was released on October 13, 2008. The third single, "Jungle Drum", was released digitally on March 9, 2009, and on June 19, 2009, it had a physical release on CD in Germany. The single has charted at number one in some European countries, including Germany, Austria, Iceland and Belgium. On August 10, 2009, Me and Armini EP was released in the United States, and on September 13, 2009, it was released in the UK.

The songs "Big Jumps", "Jungle Drum" and "Birds" were used in the TV series 90210 and Grey's Anatomy in 2008 and 2009. "Ha Ha" was also featured in an episode of Grey's Anatomy, titled "Here Comes the Flood". "Beggar's Prayer" was featured in the fifth episode of the TV series Castle, titled "A Chill Goes Through Her Veins" (2009). On May 4, 2010, the song "Gun" was used over the end credits for the opening episode of the TV-series Luther on BBC One. It was also used on the CSI: NY episode "Command+P", which aired on January 4, 2013.

== Commercial performance ==
The album has charted in several European countries, and has reached a top 20 chart position in Germany, where it has also been certified Gold. In the United States, the album has peaked at number 30 on the Billboard Top Heatseekers chart. In 2009. It was awarded a gold certification from the Independent Music Companies Association which indicated sales of at least 100,000 copies throughout Europe.

== Critical reception ==
Professional ratings
Aggregate scores
Source	Rating
Metacritic	75/100
Review scores
Source	Rating
AllMusic	4/5 stars
ARTISTdirect	4.5/5 stars
Blender	3.5/5 stars
The Guardian	3/5 stars
musicOMH	4/5 stars
PopMatters	6/10 stars
Paste	8.7/10
Slant Magazine	4/5 stars

Me and Armini received positive reviews from music critics. On Metacritic, which assigns a normalised rating out of 100 to reviews from mainstream critics, the album received an average score of 75, based on 15 reviews.

== Track listing ==
No.	Title	Length
1.	"Fireheads"	3:44
2.	"Me and Armini"	4:17
3.	"Birds"	6:23
4.	"Heard It All Before"	4:13
5.	"Ha Ha"	3:15
6.	"Big Jumps"	3:01
7.	"Jungle Drum"	2:13
8.	"Hold Heart"	2:04
9.	"Gun"	5:45
10.	"Beggar's Prayer"	2:55
11.	"Dead Duck"	5:36
12.	"Bleeder"	4:50

iTunes bonus track
No.	Title	Length
13.	"The Wolf Song"	4:24

Japanese edition bonus tracks
No.	Title	Length
13.	"The Wolf Song"	4:24
14.	"Me and Armini" (dub version)

=== Gold Edition bonus disc ===
After the success of the "Jungle Drum" single in Germany, this edition of the album was released on September 25, 2009.

1. "Me and Armini" (Mr Dan's "Magic Typewriter" remix) a.k.a. Dan Carey remix
2. "Me and Armini" (Simone Lombardi remix)
3. "Beggar's Prayer" (KRCW session)
4. "Big Jumps" (music video)
5. "Jungle Drum" (music video)
6. "Heard It All Before" (music video)

== Charts and certifications ==
=== Weekly charts ===
Chart	Peak position
Australian Albums (ARIA)	78
Austrian Albums (Ö3 Austria)	32
Belgian Albums (Ultratop Flanders)	56
Dutch Albums (Album Top 100)	94
French Albums (SNEP)	56
German Albums (Offizielle Top 100)	19
Swiss Albums (Schweizer Hitparade)	71
UK Albums (Official Charts)	96
UK Independent Albums (Official Charts)	12
US Heatseekers Albums (Billboard)	30

=== Certifications ===
Region	Certification	Certified units/sales
Germany (BVMI)	Gold	100,000^{^}
^{^} Shipments figures based on certification alone.

== Release history ==
Region	Date
Worldwide	8 September 2008
United States	9 September 2008
Japan	26 November 2008
