= Merman (album) =

Studio album by Emilíana Torrini
- Released: 1996
- Genres: Soul; blues
- Length: 58:36
- Label: JAPIS

Emilíana Torrini chronology
Crouçie d'où là (1995)	Merman (1996)	Love in the Time of Science (1999)

Merman is the second studio album by Icelandic singer-songwriter Emilíana Torrini, released in 1996. It includes covers of Tom Waits' "I Hope That I Don't Fall in Love with You" and The Velvet Underground's "Stephanie Says". It was the highest selling album in Iceland in 1996, selling over 11,677 copies in the country. It was co-produced and co-written by Jón Ólafsson. The song "The Boy Who Giggled So Sweet" was nominated as the song of the year at the Icelandic Music Awards.

== Track listing ==
All songs written by Emilíana Torrini and Jón Ólafsson unless otherwise noted.

1. "Blame It on the Sun" (Stevie Wonder)
2. "The Boy Who Giggled So Sweet"
3. "Stephanie Says" (Lou Reed)
4. "Red Woman Red"
5. "Old Man and Miss Beautiful"
6. "Chelsea Morning" (Joni Mitchell)
7. "I Hope That I Don't Fall in Love with You" (Tom Waits)
8. "Première Lovin'"
9. "Merman"
10. "I Really Loved Harold" (Melanie Safka)
