= Fisherman's Woman =

Studio album by Emilíana Torrini
- Released: 31 January 2005
- Genres: Indie pop; folk; acoustic
- Length: 39:23
- Label: Rough Trade
- Producer: Dan Carey

Emilíana Torrini chronology
Rarities (2000)	Fisherman's Woman (2005)	Me and Armini (2008)

Professional ratings
Review scores
Source	Rating
AllMusic	4/5 stars
Pitchfork Media	6.3/10
PopMatters	8/10
Stylus Magazine''	B−

Fisherman's Woman is the fourth studio album by Icelandic singer and songwriter Emilíana Torrini, released on 31 January 2005 by Rough Trade Records in the UK and 26 April 2005 in the United States. The songs "Lifesaver", "Sunnyroad" (UK #82) and "Heartstopper" (UK #126) were released as singles.

== Track listing ==
All songs written by Emilíana Torrini and Dan Carey unless otherwise noted.

1. "Nothing Brings Me Down" – 3:56
2. "Sunnyroad" – 3:04
3. "Snow" (Emilíana Torrini, Dan Carey, Jamie Cruisey) – 1:58
4. "Lifesaver" (Torrini, Carey, Siggi Baldursson) – 4:00
5. "Honeymoon Child" (Bill Callahan) – 3:09
6. "Today Has Been OK" – 3:31
7. "Next Time Around" (Sandy Denny) – 3:36
8. "Heartstopper" – 3:02
9. "At Least It Was" – 4:18
10. "Fisherman's Woman" (Torrini, Eg White) – 1:51
11. "Thinking Out Loud" (Torrini, Liam Coverdale-Howe, Chris Corner) – 3:21
12. "Serenade" (Carey, Jeymes Samuel) – 3:37

The Japanese edition has a bonus disc, which has the same tracks as the single "Heartstopper".

== Personnel ==
- Emilíana Torrini – vocals, bellow, creaks, korg
- Dan Carey – guitars, organ, pedal steel, wurlitzer, bass guitar, melodica, glockenspiel, shaker, tabla, bouzouki
- Julian Joseph – piano
- Samuli Kosminen – drums, percussion
- Pharoah S. Russell – drums (on "Heartstopper")

== Charts ==
Chart performance for Fisherman's Woman
Chart (2005)	Peak position
Australian Albums (ARIA)	90
Belgian Albums (Ultratop Flanders)	98
Belgian Albums (Ultratop Wallonia)	97
French Albums (SNEP)	67
German Albums (Offizielle Top 100)	64
Icelandic Albums (Tónlist)	1
Swiss Albums (Schweizer Hitparade)	73
UK Albums (Official Charts)	94
UK Independent Albums (Official Charts)	12
