= Emilíana Torrini =

Icelandic singer and songwriter

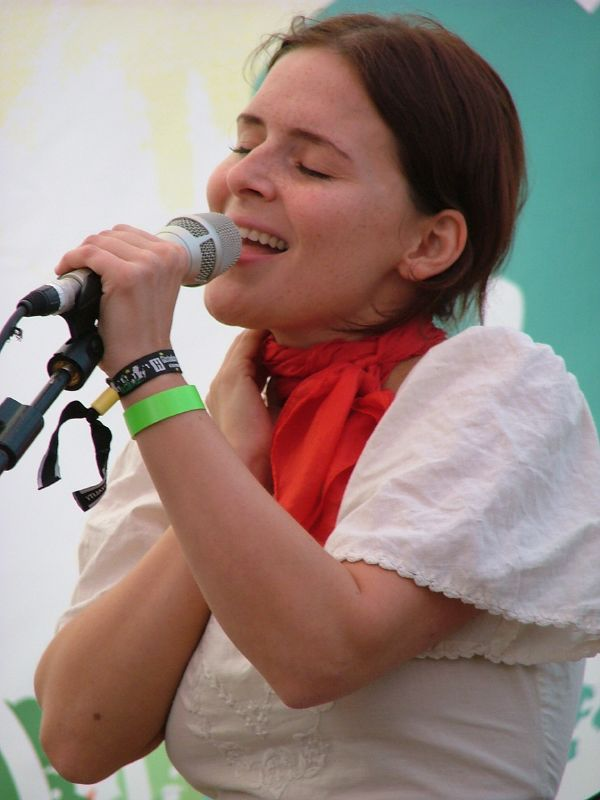
- Torrini performing at the Glastonbury Festival 2005

Background information
- Born: Emilíana Torrini Davíðsdóttir; 16 May 1977 (age 49); Iceland
- Origin: Kópavogur, Iceland
- Genres: Indie pop; alternative rock; trip hop; electronica
- Occupations: Singer; songwriter
- Instrument: Vocals
- Years active: 1994–present
- Labels: JAPIS; One Little Indian; Virgin; Rough Trade
- Website: EmilianaTorrini.com

Emilíana Torrini (born 16 May 1977) is an Icelandic singer and songwriter. Her most popular works include the 2009 single "Jungle Drum" and her third studio album Love in the Time of Science (1999). She performed "Gollum's Song" for the film The Lord of the Rings: The Two Towers (2002).

== Early life ==
Emilíana was born in Iceland, where she grew up in Kópavogur. Her father, Salvatore Torrini, is Italian, while her mother, Anna Stella Snorradóttir, is Icelandic.

Because of name regulations in Iceland when she was born, her father had to change his name to "Davíð Eiríksson", and she had to use the corresponding patronymic in her full name, Emilíana Davíðsdóttir. A few years later, the name regulations were changed, and she took the surname Torrini.

At the age of seven, she joined a choir as a soprano, until she went to opera school at the age of 15. After being discovered singing in a restaurant in Iceland by Derek Birkett, the owner of One Little Indian Records, Emilíana was asked to visit London to record a song. She decided to stay in London.

== Career ==
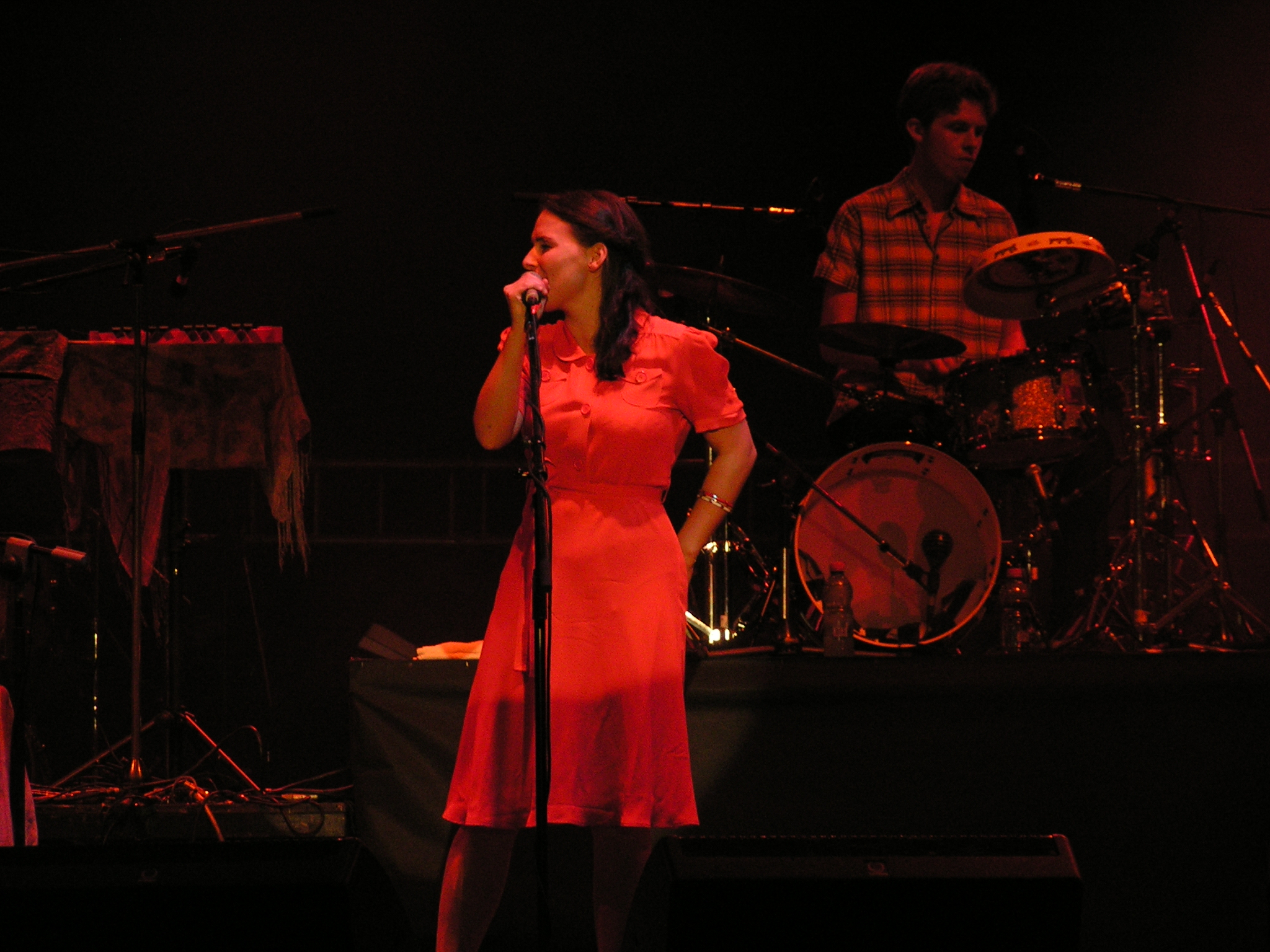
Emilíana Torrini performing in June 2005, in Haifa

Emilíana has been a member of Icelandic artist group GusGus, and contributed vocals to several songs on their debut Polydistortion (1997), most notably "Why". She co-wrote Kylie Minogue's "Slow" and "Someday" from her Body Language album in 2003. She also produced "Slow" along with Dan Carey; the two were nominated for a Best Dance Recording Grammy Award in 2005 for their work on the track. Prior to these, Emilíana contributed vocals to songs on Thievery Corporation's 2002 album The Richest Man in Babylon and was credited with composing the songs "Resolution", "Until The Morning", and "Heaven's Gonna Burn Your Eyes" from that album. Also in 2002, she sang vocals on Paul Oakenfold's song "Hold Your Hand" taken from his Bunkka album.

Her version of Jefferson Airplane's 1967 song "White Rabbit" was used in multiple action and fight scenes in the action film Sucker Punch directed by Zack Snyder. It was also used in an episode of the TV series 12 Monkeys.

On 3 June 2013, she revealed to fans that she would release her new album on 9 September 2013 in the UK. The album was released in Ireland, Iceland, Germany, Austria, and Switzerland on 6 September 2013. The new LP is titled Tookah. Emilíana played a number of music festivals in the lead up to the album's release in Russia and Budapest.

On 29 July 2013, Emilíana revealed the radio edition of a new track "Speed of Dark". Three additional tracks were also revealed allowing fans to stream, including "Autumn Sun", "Animal Games", and "Tookah".

Emilíana was featured on Kid Koala's 2017 album Music to Draw To: Satellite, where she sang on seven tracks. In 2024, she said that she had not released any album under her name between 2013 and 2023 due to a disagreement and dissatisfaction with her then label Rough Trade.

== Discography ==
- Crouçie d'où là (1995)
- Merman (1996)
- Love in the Time of Science (1999)
- Fisherman's Woman (2005)
- Me and Armini (2008)
- Tookah (2013)
- Racing the Storm with the Colorist Orchestra (2023)
- Miss Flower (2024)
