= All That Moody =

Studio album by Davey Graham
- Released: 1976
- Studio: Trident Studios, London
- Genre: Folk, blues, jazz
- Label: Eron Enterprises (ERON 007)
- Producer: Davey Graham

Davey Graham chronology
Godington Boundary (1970)	All That Moody (1976)	The Complete Guitarist (1978)

All That Moody is an album by British musician Davey Graham, released in 1976. It was his first album in six years after the release of Godington Boundary and is the first with his name spelled Davey instead of Davy. It was released on an imprint called Eron Enterprises, a small label based in Deal, Kent, set up 4 years previously to demonstrate how good South East England's folk music scene was. Graham had known Ron Milner, the label's boss, since Holly Gwinn-Graham had been on the label's first release, Folk In Sandwich (ERON 001).

All That Moody was reissued in 1999 on 10" album and CD by Rollercoaster Records, the CD containing six additional tracks.

== Reception ==
Professional ratings
Review scores
Source	Rating
Allmusic	4/5 stars

Writing for Allmusic, music critic Brian Downing wrote of the album "Graham effectively and impressively showed why he not only is considered the father of the modern British folk movement, but also a real innovator in bringing world music to a traditionally Western form. And while the remakes don't completely render the originals obsolete, they do give listeners some nice alternative versions. The instrumentals, as usual, work best, as Graham's vocals are not his strongest point. Likewise, the numbers that dabble in blues, jazz, or ragtime, while adding a touch of variety, really don't impress as much as the genre-fusing ones"

== Original track listing ==
=== Side One ===
1. "La Morena" – 4:32
2. "Anji" – 1:26
3. "Travelling Man" – 1:57
4. "Sunshine Raga" – 3:46
5. "A Smooth One" – 2:12
6. "Kim" – 2:24
7. "Jenra" – 2:04

=== Side Two ===
1. "No Preacher" – 2:37
2. "To Find the Sun" – 2:23
3. "Tristano" – 3:38
4. "Blues for Geno" – 3:05
5. "Fingerbuster" – 1:53
6. "Blue Raga" – 4:38

== Track listing of reissue ==
All songs by Davey Graham unless otherwise noted.

1. "Anji" – 1:26
2. "La Morena" – 4:32
3. "Travelling Man" – 1:57
4. "Sunshine Raga" – 3:46
5. "A Smooth One" – 2:12
6. "Kim" – 2:24
7. "Jenra" – 2:04
8. "No Preacher" – 2:37
9. "To Find the Sun" – 2:23
10. "Tristano" – 3:38
11. "Blues for Geno" – 3:05
12. "Fingerbuster" – 1:53
13. "Blue Raga" (Ravi Shankar and Ali Akbar Khan)– 4:38
  1999 reissue bonus tracks:
14. "La Morena" – 3:45
15. "All of Me" (Gerald Marks, Seymour Simons) – 2:21
16. "Suite in D Minor" (Arr. Graham, Robert de Visée) – 3:56
17. "Happy Meeting in Glory" (Traditional Arranged by Davey Graham) – 2:07
18. "The Gold Ring" (Traditional Arranged by Davey Graham) – 2:34
19. "For a Princess" – 2:37

== Personnel ==
- Davey Graham – vocals, guitar, bass, tabla, tamboura
- Keshav Sathe – tabla, tamboura
- Roger Bunn – bass
