= Magic Carpet (band) =

British psychedelic folk band

- Origin: England
- Genres: Psychedelic; folk
- Years active: 1970s
- Past members: Clem Alford; Alisha Sufit; Jim Moyes; Keshav Sathe

Magic Carpet was a pioneering British psychedelic folk band of musicians that first appeared in the early 1970s.

The band members were Clem Alford, sitar; Alisha Sufit, voice and guitar; Jim Moyes, guitar; and Keshav Sathe, Indian tabla percussion. In 1972 the band released an eponymous album, Magic Carpet, on the Mushroom (UK) label that has since become a sought-after item in the international collectors' vinyl market.

== History ==
In the 1960s and 1970s, both in the UK and in America, there was a burgeoning interest in Indian culture and music, most famously spearheaded by virtuoso sitar player Ravi Shankar and sarod player Ali Akbar Khan, amongst others. Numerous UK bands of the era began to use sitar and Indian musical sounds generally to add a flavor of the east to their recordings. By contrast, Magic Carpet was a more cohesive Anglo-Indian fusion, the Indian instrumentation generating and being integral to the music, not simply an addition. Based around the classically trained sitar virtuoso, Alford, and the ethereal voice of Alisha Sufit, Magic Carpet created a distinctive sound described (perhaps misleadingly) as "psychedelic progressive folk" music – psych prog folk.

The Magic Carpet album originally had little success in the 1970s, mostly because the band split up in 1972, but less than twenty years later, with renewed interest in music of the time, particularly in rare records, articles were written in various journals such as Record Collector, Ptolemaic Terrascope and others. Tracks from the Magic Carpet band's eponymous album have latterly appeared on various reissue compilations, most notably in 2008 on A Monstrous Psychedelic Bubble Exploding in Your Mind: Volume 1, voted No 1 favourite by Noel Gallagher in Mojo magazine in 2008. The Magic Carpet band was included in various books about music of the era including Electric Eden, with the track "The Dream" included on the associated Electric Eden album; plus Seasons They Change: The Story of Acid and Psychedelic Folk by Jeanette Leech

== Albums ==
The Magic Carpet album has been described as 'a jewelled crown in the treasure trove of psyche-tinged folk music' Magic Carpet being one of the first bands to truly combine Indian and western instrumentation. After a launch at the 100 Club, London, UK, the Magic Carpet band performed at Cleo Laine and Johnny Dankworth's Wavendon, enjoyed airplay on Pete Drummond's Sounds of the Seventies on BBC Radio, plus made several club and festival appearances. However, this novel collective split up shortly after the first album was released. It was only after a lapse of some fifteen years that recognition followed.

Widely and more positively reviewed, the original Magic Carpet album was reissued on CD and vinyl by the UK Magic Carpet Records label.

Seven of the vocal tracks written by Sufit employ modal tunings in the guitar accompaniment. These 'open' guitar tunings, first introduced and popularized by musicians such as Davey Graham and Joni Mitchell, are supremely compatible with the modal tuning of the sitar, allowing a true integration of sounds. Sufit's vocals feature on nine of the twelve tracks, the remaining three being purely instrumental.

In 1996, Alford and Sufit got together again and collaborated to record the album Once Moor, subtitled Magic Carpet 2. It is a true follow on from the original Magic Carpet album, with its simple acoustic instrumentation – guitar, sitar, tabla, tamboura, and Appalachian dulcimer. The album was issued on CD and heavy-weight vinyl. Around the same time, the album by Clem Alford entitled Mirror Image was reissued, also by Magic Carpet Records, a record first released on vinyl in 1974.
