= Murino =

Murino may refer to:

== People ==
- Caterina Murino, an Italian actress

== Places ==
- Murino, Leningrad Oblast, a town in Russia
- Murino, Plav, a village in Montenegro

== See also ==
- Battle of Murino
- Egidius de Francia, also known as Egidius de Murino
- Zun-Murino
