= Godington Boundry =

Studio album by Davy Graham
- Released: 1970
- Studio: RG Jones, London, UK
- Genre: Folk, blues, jazz
- Length: 45:01
- Label: President, See for Miles
- Producer: Frank Lee

Davy Graham chronology
| Holly Kaleidoscope (1970) | Godington Boundry (1970) | All That Moody (1976) |

Godington Boundry is an album by British musician Davy Graham, released in 1970. It is credited to "Davy Graham & Holly".

== Reception ==
Professional ratings
Review scores
| Source | Rating |
|---|---|
| Allmusic | 3/5 stars |

In his Allmusic review, critic Ritchie Unterberger wrote, "This isn't Graham's most focused or impressive album, but is basically in the same league as most of his early catalog"

== Track listing ==
1. "I'm a Freeborn Man (of the Travelling People)" (Ewan MacColl) – 2:11
2. "The Preacher" (Horace Silver) – 2:59
3. "All of Me" (Gerald Marks, Seymour Simons) – 5:05
4. "Afta" (Keshav Sathe) – 3:20
5. "On Green Dolphin Street" (Bronisław Kaper, Ned Washington) – 1:58
6. "Dallas Rag" (Traditional) – 1:43
7. "'Round Midnight" (Thelonious Monk, Cootie Williams, Bernie Hanighen) – 4:37
8. "Work Song" (Nat Adderley, Oscar Brown, Jr.) – 8:14
9. "Joe, Joe, the Cannibal Kid" (Traditional; arranged by Davy Graham) – 1:48
10. "Everything's Fine Right Now" (Mike Heron) – 1:42
11. "A Mighty Fortress Is Our God (Eine feste Burg ist unser Gott)" (Martin Luther; arranged by Davy Graham) – 1:56
12. "Mother Nature's Son" (John Lennon, Paul McCartney) – 1:55
13. "Grooveyard" (Carl Perkins) – 3:38
14. "Forty Ton Parachute" (Davy Graham) – 1:14
15. "Nadu Silma" (Ahmed Abdul-Malik) – 2:41

== Personnel ==
- Davy Graham – vocals, guitar
- Holly Gwyn – vocals
- Keshav Sathe – tabla
- Eddie Tripp – bass
- Tony Kinsey – drums

Technical

- Frank Lee - producer, arrangements
- Gerry Kitchingham - engineer
