= Folk baroque =

Music genre

- Other names: Baroque guitar
- Stylistic origins: Folk; Baroque music; jazz; blues; ragtime; progressive folk
- Cultural origins: 1960s
- Typical instruments: Acoustic guitar

Other topics
- Baroque pop

Folk baroque or baroque guitar is a distinctive and influential guitar fingerstyle developed in Britain in the 1960s, which combined elements of American folk, blues, jazz and ragtime with British folk music to produce a new and elaborate form of accompaniment. It has been highly important in folk music, folk rock and British folk rock playing, particularly in Britain, Ireland, North America and France.

== Definition ==
Particularly notable in the folk baroque style was the adoption of DADGAD tuning, which gave a form of suspended-fourth D chord, usefully neither major or minor, which could be employed as the basis for modal-based folk songs. It is uncertain who first developed this tuning, as both Davy Graham and Martin Carthy attributed it to each other, but it has been speculated that Graham may have acquired it from the oud while visiting north Africa. This was combined with a fingerstyle based on Travis picking and a focus on melody, that made it suitable as an accompaniment. Robin Denselow, who popularized the phrase "folk baroque", singled out Graham's recording of traditional English folk song "Seven Gypsies" on Folk, Blues and Beyond (1965) as the beginning of the style.

== History ==
=== Origins ===
Many of the English folk musicians who emerged in the early 1960s as part of the Second British folk revival began their careers in the short-lived skiffle craze of the later 1950s and as a result were familiar with American blues, folk and jazz styles. Initially they copied these styles, occasionally using open D and G tunings, but by the early 1960s a distinctive way of playing acoustic guitar began to emerge as performers like Davy Graham and Martin Carthy attempted to apply these styles to the playing of traditional English modal music. They were soon followed by artists such as Bert Jansch and John Renbourn, who further defined the style.

A landmark in this early period was the release, by Topic, of the EP 3/4 A.D by Alexis Korner and Davy Graham in April 1962. This includes the instrumental "Angi" which was to become Graham's best-known composition, as well as the title track "3/4 A.D.", named after its time signature and the initials of the two performers. This instrumental piece took its inspiration from jazz sources such as Miles Davis and Charles Mingus, but was in the form of an acoustic guitar duet by Korner and Graham—one of the earliest recordings of folk baroque. The sleeve notes by Korner struggled to classify the music but twice resort to the term "baroque".

=== Development ===
While Graham mixed this with a swathe of Indian, African, American, Celtic and modern and traditional American influences, Carthy in particular used the tuning in order to replicate the drone of uilleann pipes, hurdy-gurdy or the fiddle found in British medieval and folk music, played by the thumb on the two lowest strings. The style was further developed by Jansch, who brought a more forceful style of picking and, indirectly, influences from jazz and ragtime, leading particularly to more complex basslines. Renbourn built on all these trends and was the artist whose repertoire was most influenced by Medieval and Renaissance music.

In the early 1970s, the next generation of British artists added new tunings and techniques, reflected in the work of artists like Nick Drake, Tim Buckley and particularly John Martyn, whose Solid Air (1972) set the bar for subsequent British acoustic guitarists. Perhaps the most prominent exponent of recent years has been Martin Simpson, whose complex mix of traditional English and American material, together with innovative arrangements and techniques like the use of guitar slides, represents a deliberate attempt to create a unique and personal style.

== Significance ==
As well as being a continuing influence in Britain, which created a network of underground folk clubs across the country, mostly in urban centres, the style had an impact elsewhere. Martin Carthy passed on his guitar style to French guitarist Pierre Bensusan, who made it part of his own technique for playing French and Irish music. Perhaps from here it was taken up by in Scotland by Dick Gaughan, but particularly by Irish musicians like Paul Brady, Dónal Lunny and Mick Moloney. Carthy also influenced Paul Simon, particularly evident on "Scarborough Fair", which he taught to Simon, and a recording of Graham's "Anji" that appears on Sounds of Silence, and as a result was copied by many subsequent folk guitarists. By the 1970s, Americans such as Duck Baker and Eric Schoenberg were arranging solo guitar versions of Celtic dance tunes, slow airs, bagpipe music, and harp pieces by Turlough O'Carolan and earlier harper-composers. Renbourn and Jansch's complex sounds were also highly influential on Mike Oldfield's early music. The style also had an impact within British folk rock, where, particularly Richard Thompson used the DADGAD tuning, but with a hybrid picking style to produce a similar, but distinctive effect.

== See also ==
- American primitive guitar
- New Acoustic Music
- Progressive folk
