= British Library, Add MS 29987 =

Add MS 29987
- British Library
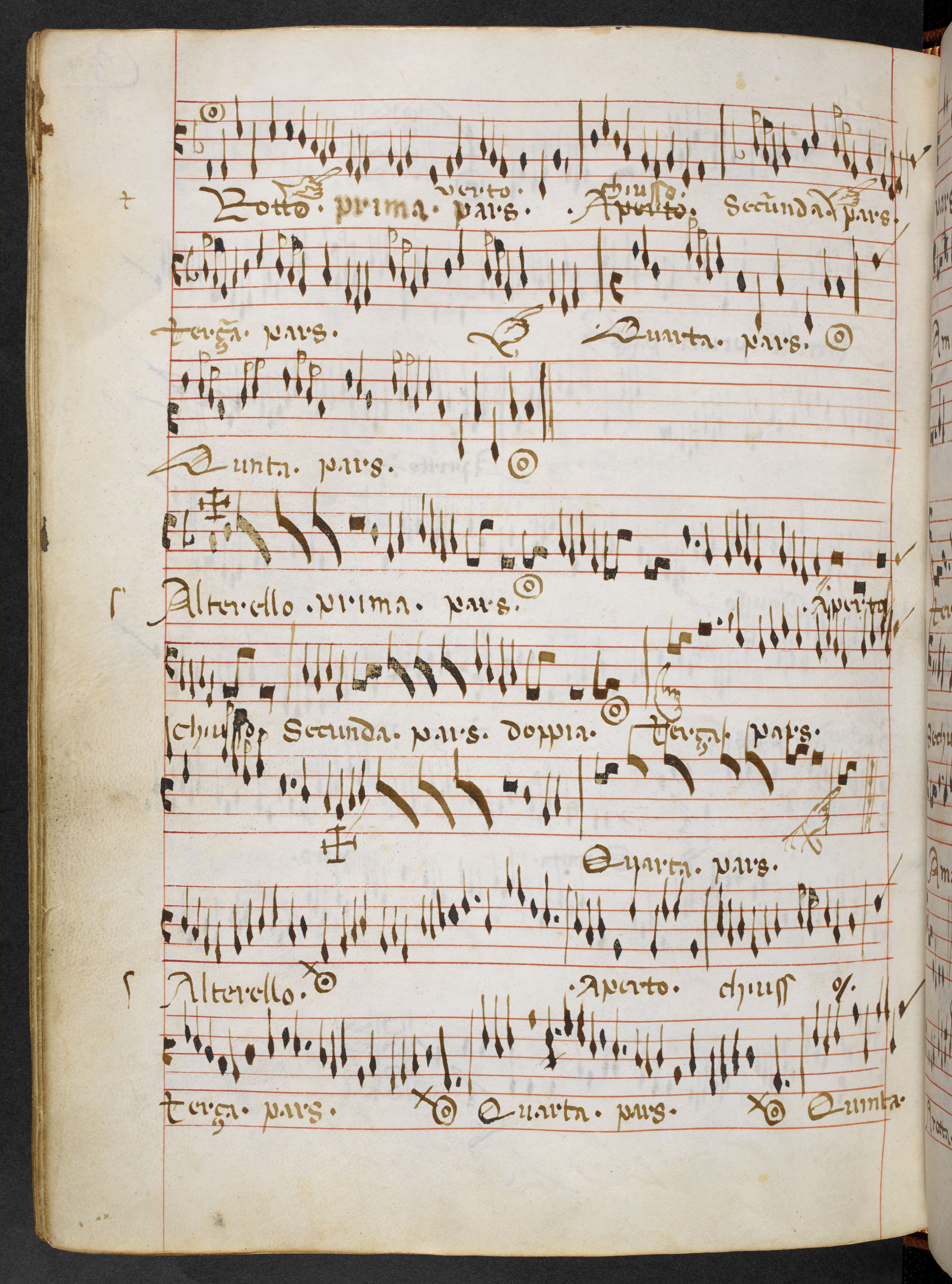
- Facsimile of f. 63v of the manuscript, showing the Trotto and part of a saltarello
- Also known as: London BM Add. 29987
- Date: about 1400
- Place of origin: Tuscany or possibly Umbria
- Language: Tuscan
- Material: parchment
- Size: 26 × 19.5 cm
- Format: quarto
- Contents: vocal and instrumental music
- Previously kept: de' Medici family; Carlo di Tommaso Strozzi; private library in Florence; British Museum

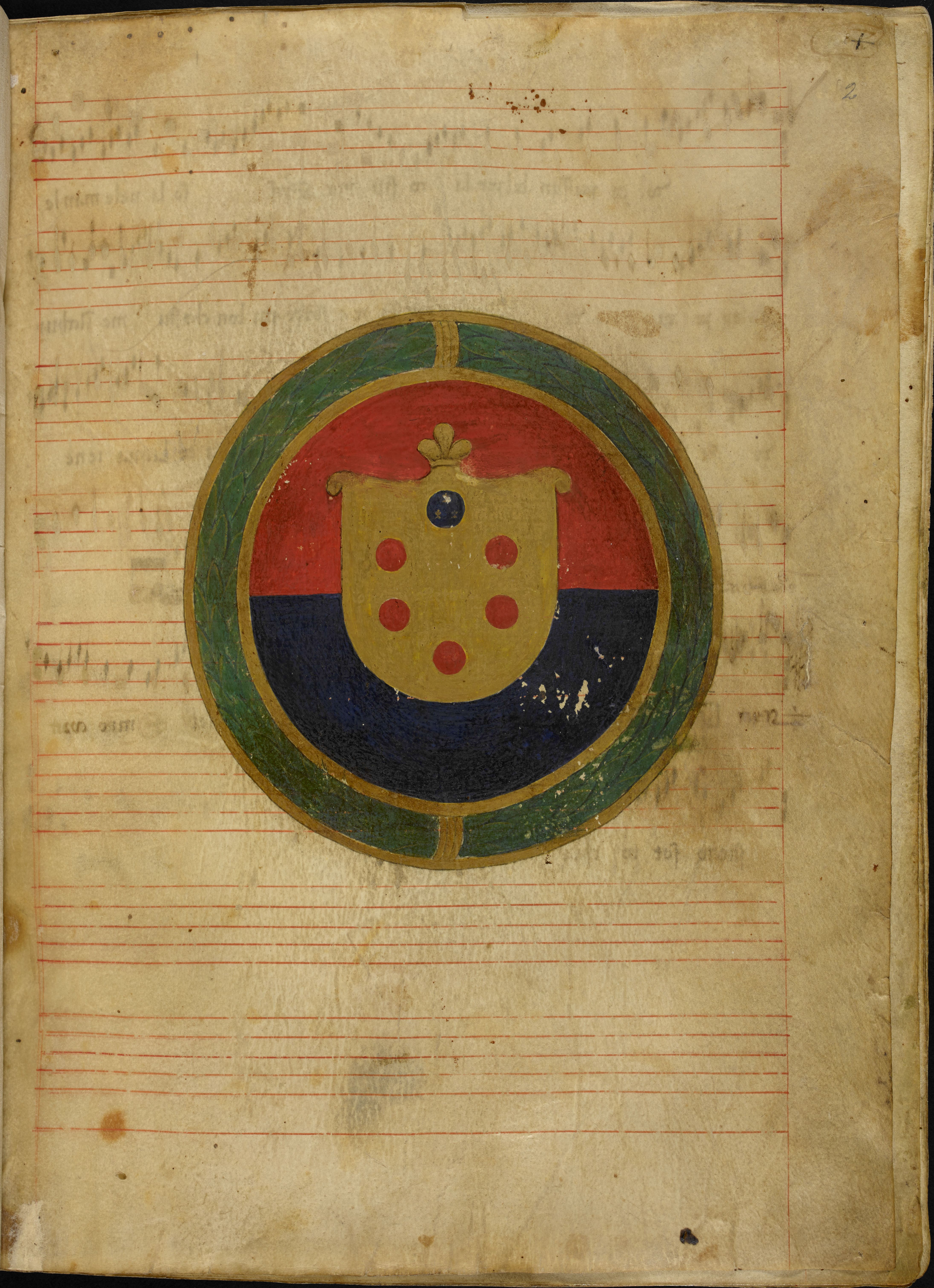
Folio 1 of the manuscript, bearing the coat-of-arms of the de' Medici family

Add MS 29987 is a mediaeval Tuscan musical manuscript dating from the late fourteenth or early fifteenth century, held in the British Library in London. It contains a number of polyphonic Italian Trecento madrigals, ballate, sacred mass movements, and motets, and 15 untexted monophonic instrumental dances, which are among the earliest purely instrumental pieces in the Western musical tradition. The manuscript apparently belonged to the de' Medici family in the fifteenth century, and by 1670 was in the possession of Carlo di Tommaso Strozzi; it was in the British Museum from 1876, where it was catalogued as item 29987 of the Additional manuscripts series. It is now in the British Library.

== The manuscript ==
The manuscript appears to have belonged to the de' Medici family of the Republic of Florence in the fifteenth century – the first folio has the de' Medici arms in red, gold, blue and green; these are in the "augmented" form granted by Louis XI in 1465, with the arms of France in the upper central ball. By 1670 it was in the possession of Carlo di Tommaso Strozzi. On 8 April 1876 it was acquired by the British Museum from the antiquarian bookseller Bernard Quaritch; (Note: One of the 1876 flyleaves carries the inscription "Purchased of B. Quaritch 8 Apr. 1876") it was catalogued as item 29987 of the Additional manuscripts series. It is now in the British Library.

The manuscript measures approximately 26 × 19.5 cm, and consists of 88 parchment leaves in 11 quaternio gatherings. There are six flyleaves at the front, one from 1957, three from 1876 and two from the seventeenth century, of which the first has a list in the hand of Carlo di Tommaso Strozzi of the composers represented; two flyleaves at the back date from 1876 and 1957. The binding in half leather is from 1957, over older thick wooden boards.

Add 29987 is a part of a larger manuscript of at least 185 pages, as the surviving leaves were originally numbered 98–185. The pages are ruled with eight five-line staves in red, and the music is written in full (black) mensural notation, with only occasional use of void ("white") notes and red colouration. It is carelessly written in one principal and several other scribal hands; the musical text is corrupted in many places by a later hand, which altered the rhythms and added inappropriate rests.

The exact date of the manuscript remains uncertain; estimates range from the late fourteenth century to about 1425. The music dates from 1340–1400; one piece, number 118, is clearly of later date, and numbers 115–117 may also be somewhat later than most of the others. The geographical origin of the manuscript is equally uncertain; it is thought to be either Tuscany or Umbria. The titles of two of the instrumental pieces, "Isabella" and "Principio di virtù", may suggest a connection to Perugia, which was ruled between 1400 and 1402 by Gian Galeazzo Visconti; Visconti was, through his marriage to Isabella, Countess of Vertus, the comte de Vertus, or, in Italian, the Conte di Virtù. However Visconti was also Duke of Milan, and the manuscript may thus be connected with that city.

== The works ==
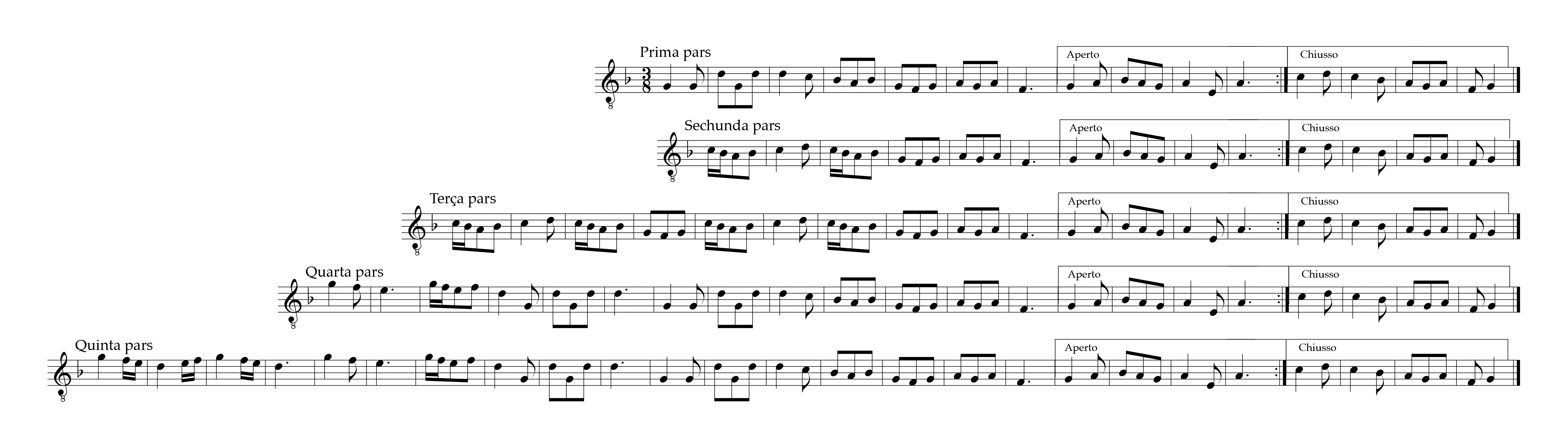
Transcription in reduced note values of the Trotto on f. 63v, showing aperto and chiusso endings

Add MS 29987 contains 119 pieces of music; however, three of them are copied twice, so there are 116 different pieces. Of these, 45 are ballate, 35 or 36 (if a fragment is counted) are madrigals, 15 are instrumental pieces under the general title of "istampitta" or estampie, 8 are cacce and 3 are virelais. There are also a motet and a "Chançonete tedesce" or canzonetta tedesca, and 7 liturgical works, kyrie, gloria, credo, antiphon, two sequences and a hymn; the last piece is untexted, but may be a madrigal. Forty-three of the pieces, including all the instrumental works, are unica.

Eighty-two of the pieces, all but one of them polyphonic, can be attributed to their composers, either because the composer's name is given in the manuscript or by comparison with other sources. Half of these are by either Francesco Landini (29) or Niccolò da Perugia (12 and a fragment). There are seven works by Jacopo da Bologna, five by each of Bartolino da Padova, Giovanni da Cascia and Lorenzo da Firenze, and three by each of Bonaiuto Corsini, Donato da Cascia, Gherardello da Firenze and Vincenzo da Rimini. Andrea da Firenze, Jacopo Pianelaio da Firenze, Paolo da Firenze, Rosso de Collegrana and Thomas de Celano are each represented by a single piece. There is one ballata by Guglielmus and Egidius de Francia, and a madrigal by Guglielmus alone.

== List of contents of the manuscript ==
The 119 pieces in the manuscript are:

Number	Name/ beginning of text	Composer	Genre	Unicum?	Notes
1	O dolç' apress' un bel perlaro fiume	Jacopo da Bologna	madrigal		same as #3
2	Di novo e giont' un cavalier errante	Jacopo da Bologna	madrigal		
3	O dolç' apress' un bel perlaro fiume	Jacopo da Bologna	madrigal		same as #1
4	O perlaro gentil	Giovanni da Cascia	madrigal		
5	Apress' un fiume chiaro	Giovanni da Cascia	madrigal		
6	Per allegreça del parlar d'amore	Francesco Landini	ballata		
7	O tu chara scientia	Giovanni da Cascia	madrigal		
8	Si chome al canto de la bella iguana	Jacopo da Bologna	madrigal		
9	Sedendo al ombra d'una bella mandorla	Giovanni da Cascia	madrigal		
10	Si dolce non sono	Francesco Landini	madrigal		
11	Musica son che mi dolgho piaggendo; Gia furon le dolceççe mie; Ciascun vole narrar	Francesco Landini	madrigal		
12	Una colomba candid' e genti	Francesco Landini	madrigal		
13	Alba cholumba con sua verde rama	Bartolino da Padova	madrigal		
14	Prima vertute chon stringer la lingua	Jacopo da Bologna	madrigal		
15	Mille merce	Egidius and Guglielmus de Francia	ballata		
16	Quando la terra parturessen verde	Bartolino da Padova	madrigal		same as #24
17	La dolce cera	Bartolino da Padova	madrigal		
18	Non posso far buchato	anon.	ballata		
19	Useletto selvagio	Jacopo da Bologna	madrigal		
20	Un bel parlare vive sulla riva	Jacopo da Bologna	madrigal	×	
21	Piu non mi churo	Giovanni da Cascia	madrigal		
22	I credo ch'i dormiva	Lorenzo da Firenze	madrigal		
23	Qual legie move	Bartolino da Padova	madrigal		
24	Quando la terra parturessen verde	Bartolino da Padova	madrigal		same as #16
25	Per sparverare	Jacopo da Bologna	caccia		
26	Non avra mai pieta	Francesco Landini	ballata		
27	Donna, s'i t'o falito	Francesco Landini	ballata		
28	Guard' una volta	Francesco Landini	ballata		
29	Io son un pellegrin	anon.	ballata		
30	Perche di novo sdegno	Francesco Landini	ballata		
31	Tosto che l'alba	Gherardello da Firenze	caccia		
32	L'aspido sord[o] e'l tirello scorçone	Donato da Firenze	madrigal		
33	La dona mia	Niccolò da Perugia	ballata		
34	Non senti donna piu piacer	anon.	ballata	×	
35	Se pronto non sara	Francesco Landini	ballata		
36	Nella piu chara parte	Francesco Landini	ballata		
37	Sta quel ch'esser po	Andrea da Firenze	ballata	×	
38	Gran piant' agli occhi	Francesco Landini	ballata		
39	Adyou, adyou, dous dame volie	Francesco Landini	virelai		
40	Partesi con dolore	Francesco Landini	ballata		
41	I son tua donna	Niccolò da Perugia	ballata	×	
42	La mantacha ssera tututu lo primo; Cum martelli incrudena	anon.	ballata	×	
43	In forma quasi tra 'l veglar	Vincenzo da Rimini	caccia		same as #96
44	Piu bella donna 'l mondo ma non	Francesco Landini	ballata	×	
45	Donna, non fu giamay	Bonaiuto Corsini	ballata	×	
46	Vidi nell'ombra	Lorenzo da Firenze	madrigal		
47	Piata ti mova	Bonaiuto Corsini	ballata	×	
48	Amor, tu vedi ch'io per te	Bonaiuto Corsini	ballata	×	
49	Povero çappator	Lorenzo da Firenze	madrigal		
50	I fu gia bianch' ucciel	Donato da Firenze	madrigal		
51	Po che da tte mi	Francesco Landini	ballata		
52	Cantano gl'angiolieti Santus	anon.	motet	×	
53	Io vegio in gran dolo	Niccolò da Perugia	ballata		
54	Chosi pensoso	Francesco Landini	caccia	×	
55	Chi 'l ben sofri non po	Niccolò da Perugia	ballata		
56	Nell' aqua chiara	Vincenzo da Rimini	caccia		
57	Dappoy che 'l sole i dolçi raçi	Niccolò da Perugia	caccia		
58	State su, donne	Niccolò da Perugia	caccia	×	
59	Itta se n'era star	Lorenzo da Firenze	madrigal		
60	No dispregiar vi[r]tu	Niccolò da Perugia	madrigal		
61	Ita se n'era star	Vincenzo da Rimini	madrigal		
62	Soto verdi frascetti	Gherardello da Firenze	madrigal		
63	Mentre che vagho viso	Niccolò da Perugia	ballata		
64	La neve e 'l ghiaccio e venti d'oriente	Guglielmus de Francia	madrigal	×	
65	I pregho amor	Francesco Landini	ballata		
66	Come tradi[r] pe[n]sasti donna may	Jacopo Pianelaio da Firenze	ballata	×	
67	Lasso, per mie fortuno post' amore	Francesco Landini	ballata		
68	Quanto piu charo fay	Francesco Landini	ballata		
69	Per lla 'nfruença di Saturn e Marte	Francesco Landini	madrigal		
70	Se non ti piaque	Paolo da Firenze	madrigal		
70a	[Povero pellegrin]	Niccolò da Perugia	madrigal		fragment, one untexted line only
71	Donna, i prego amor	Francesco Landini	ballata		
72	Benche partir da te	Niccolò da Perugia	ballata		
73	Posando l'onbra delle verde fronde	anon.	madrigal	×	
74	Bench'i serva con fe	anon.	ballata	×	
75	Donna, tu pur i vecchi	anon.	ballata	×	
76	[D]iligenter advertant chantores	Lorenzo da Firenze	antiphon	×	
77	Ghaetta	anon.	estampie	×	
78	Chominciamento di gioia	anon.	estampie	×	
79	Isabella	anon.	estampie	×	
80	Tre fontane	anon.	estampie	×	
81	Belicha	anon.	estampie	×	
82	Gia perch'i penso	Francesco Landini	ballata		
83	Bench' amar, crudel donna	anon.	ballata	×	
84	Parlamento	anon.	estampie	×	
85	In pro	anon.	estampie	×	
86	Principio di virtu	anon.	estampie	×	
87	Salterello	anon.	saltarello	×	
88	Trotto	anon.	trotto	×	
89	Salterello	anon.	saltarello	×	
90	Salterello	anon.	saltarello	×	
91	Lamento di Tristano; La rotta	anon.	dance pair	×	
92	La Manfredina; La rotta della Manfredina	anon.	dance pair	×	
93	Salterello	anon.	saltarello	×	
94	Dies irae	Thomas de Celano	sequence	×	
95	Surgit Christus	anon.	sequence	×	
96	In forma quasi tra 'l vegliar	Vincenzo da Rimini	caccia		same as #43
97	I son c'a seguitar	Niccolò da Perugia	madrigal		
98	Ciascum faccia per se	Niccolò da Perugia	caccia		
99	Gi porte mi ebramant	Donato da Firenze	virelai		
100	Con levrier e mastini	Gherardello da Firenze	madrigal		
101	Tremando piu che foglia	Rosso de Collegrana	madrigal	×	
102	Chosa non e ch'a se tanto mi tiri	anon.	ballata	×	
103	Non piu no piu diro	Niccolò da Perugia	ballata	×	
104	El gra disio	Francesco Landini	ballata		
105	Chançonete tedesche	anon.	"canzonetta tedesca"	×	textless, appears to give the tenor of four German songs
106	L'alma mia piagie	Francesco Landini	ballata		
107	Nessun ponga sperança	Francesco Landini	ballata		
108	Or sus, vous dormét	anon.	virelai		
109	Segugi a corde	anon.	caccia		
110	Comtenplar le gran cose	Francesco Landini	ballata		
111	Dolcie signorie	Francesco Landini	ballata		
112	La dolce vista	Francesco Landini	ballata		
113	Luce'a nel prato	Francesco Landini	madrigal		
114	Per um verde boschetto	Bartolino da Padova	ballata		
115	Kyrie	anon.	ordinary of the mass	×	
116	Et in terra	anon.	ordinary of the mass	×	
117	Patrem	anon.	ordinary of the mass	×	
118	Tibi Christe splendor	anon.	hymn	×	in a later hand
119	[textless piece]	anon.	madrigal (?)	×	

== Recordings ==
The following discs contain some of the instrumental dances found in this manuscript:

- Landini e la musica fiorentina – Secolo XIV, Ensemble Micrologus, dir. Patrizia Bovi (Opus 111, OP 30 112)
- Istampitta – Musiques de fête à la cour des Visconti en Italie à la fin du XIVe siècle, Alla Francesca, dir. Pierre Hamon, Carlo Rizzo (Opus 111, OP 30 325)
  Contains three salterelli, the Lamento di Tristano and the istampitte: Isabella, Tre Fontane, Principio di virtù and In Pro.
- Landini and Italian Ars Nova, Alla Francesca, dir. Pierre Hamon (Opus 111, 60-9206).
  Contains the istampitta Belicha.
- Tristan et Yseut, Alla Francesca, dir. Pierre Hamon and Brigitte Lesne (Zig-Zag Territoires, ZZT 051002), 2005.
  Contains the Lamento di Tristano.
- Troubadours – Trouvères – Minstrels, Studio der frühen Musik, dir. Thomas Binkley (Teldec)
  Contains a salterello and the Chançonete tedesche Nbs 1 and 3.
- Llibre Vermell – Robin et Marion, Studio der Frühen Musik, dir. Thomas Binkley (Teldec)
  Contains the trotto
- Estampie: Instrumentalmusik des Mittelalters, Studio der Frühen Musik, participants in the Schola Cantorum Basiliensis, dir. Thomas Binkley (EMI Electrola LP 1C 063-30 122), 1974; (reissued on CD 8 26491 2), 2000. Contains the Istanpitte Ghaetta, Parlamento, Belicha, Isabella, and Principio di Virtu, together with the Lamento di Tristano/Rotta, La Manfredina/Rotta, and one Salterello
- The Art of Courtly Love, Early Music Consort of London, dir. David Munrow (Virgin Veritas)
  Contains the istampitta Tre Fontane
- Early Music Festival, Early Music Consort of London, dir. David Munrow (London Records, 2 CD), 1998.
  Contains the istampitta Ghaetta, the Lamento di Tristano, La Manfredina, the trotto and a salterello.
- Lamento di Tristano, Capella de Ministrers, dir. Carles Magraner (CDM), 2003.
  Contains the istampitte Belicha, Chominciamento di gioia, Ghaetta, In pro, Isabella and Parlamento, the Lamento di Tristano, La Manfredina and three saltarelli.
- Narcisso speculando, Mala Punica, dir. Pedro Memelsdorff (Harmonia Mundi), 2002.
  Contains the istampitta Isabella
- Danses, Danseryes, Musica Antiqua, dir. Christian Mendoze (Disques Pierre Verany)
  Contains the Lamento di Tristano, La Manfredina, the trotto and two saltarelli.
- La Lira d'Esperia, Jordi Savall and Pedro Estevan (Auvidis Astrée).
  Contains the istampitta In pro, the Lamento di Tristano, La Manfredina, the trotto and two saltarelli.
- Music for a Medieval Banquet, The Newberry Consort, dir. Mary Springfels (Harmonia Mundi)
  Contains the istampitte Cominciamento di gioia, Principio de virtù and the trotto
- Futuro antico I, Angelo Branduardi (EMI), 1996.
  Contains a Salterello, the Lamento di Tristano and La Rotta
- The Lady and the Unicorn, John Renbourn (Transatlantic Records), 1970.
  Contains adaptations of the Trotto, Saltarrello, Lamento Di Tristan and La Rotta.
- Chominciamento di gioia: Virtuoso Dance Music from the Time of Boccaccio's Decamerone, Ensemble Unicorn (Naxos Records), 1994.
  Dedicated solely to this manuscript; contains adaptations of the Chominciamento di gioia, Lamento di Tristano, La Rotta, Belicha, Tre fontane, Parlamento, Principio di virtú, three salterelli, Trotto, Isabella, Ghaetta, In pro, and La Manfredina with its Rotta.
- A Dance in the Garden of Mirth: Medieval Instrumental Music, The Dufay Collective (Chandos Records CD, CHAN 9320), 1994. Includes Ghaetta, Belicha, Isabella, Trotto, and two salterelli.
