= Alisha Sufit =

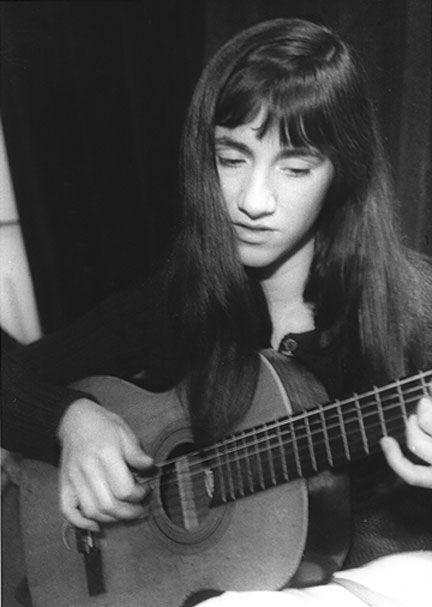

Background information
- Born: 1946 (age 79–80); Hampstead, London, England
- Formerly of: Magic Carpet
- Website: www.alishasufit.com

Alisha Sufit (born 1946) was the English singer-songwriter with the 1970s Magic Carpet, whose eponymous first album was released on the UK Mushroom label in 1972. The Mushroom label is not to be confused with the Australian label of the same name, and was led by Vic Keary from the late 1960s from Chalk Farm Studios in Belmont Street, London.

== History ==
Alisha Sufit was born in Hampstead, London, England. She attended the Arts Educational School in London, where she studied dance and drama. She went to Chelsea College of Art, London, to study painting and etching, and then to the École nationale supérieure des Beaux-Arts in Paris, France, after which she began performing in clubs and colleges around the UK, singing her own compositions plus traditional folk songs, self-accompanied on acoustic guitar and Appalachian dulcimer. She is also a visual artist, author and poet.

In 1971, Sufit joined with ex Chelsea School of Art fellow student Jim Moyes plus two musical friends to form the psychedelic progressive folk-rock band, Magic Carpet. The line-up consisted of Sufit (vocals, guitar), Clem Alford (sitar, esraj, tamboura), Jim Moyes (guitar) and Keshav Sathe tabla, Indian percussion.

The Magic Carpet band made an eponymous album released in 1972 on the UK Mushroom label, described as one of the first Indian-influenced psychedelic folk albums of the era. After a launch at the 100 Club in London, a performance at Cleo Laine and Johnny Dankworth's Stables Theatre Wavendon, radio airplay on Pete Drummond's Sounds of the Seventies on BBC Radio, plus several club and festival appearances, the group disbanded in 1972.

During the 1970s and 1980s, Sufit performed solo and was also supporting artist alongside numerous musicians including The Enid, Fairport Convention, Terry Reid, the guitarist Davey Graham (also known as Davy Graham), The Incredible String Band, amongst others. She was invited to appear at the Incredible String Band's I.S.B. Convention concert in Leeds in 1994.

Some fifteen years after its release, the Magic Carpet album began to receive acclaim, the original LP now a sought-after collectable on the international vinyl market, reissued on CD and limited edition vinyl by Magic Carpet Records (UK).

In 1993, Sufit released the album Alisha Through the Looking Glass, on CD and heavy-weight EMI audiophile vinyl. The album included contributions by Ray Warleigh (saxophone), Bernard O'Neill (bass), Magic Carpet percussionist Keshav Sathe (tabla), Mamadi Kamara (congas and percussion), Chris Haigh (fiddle) and Alan Dunn (accordion). In 1994, Sufit released the album Love and the Maiden, recorded in 1974, a signed limited edition CD with sleeve notes by UK guitarist Davey Graham.

In 1996, Magic Carpet sitarist Clem Alford and Sufit collaborated again to record the album Once Moor, subtitled Magic Carpet II, featured in Sound on Sound magazine. In 1999, she contributed two tracks to the compilation album Women of Heart and Mind, a collaboration of women singer-songwriters, and in 2005 she was included in the compilation CD and vinyl album Many Bright Things, contributing her own composition "Silver Witch", accompanied on mandolin and bass by Frank Defina.

In 2008, she was invited to join the live band The Amorphous Androgynous on tour for the Creation of Peace free festival in Kazan, Tatarstan and a performance in Moscow, plus for the following year in Kiev, Ukraine, Green Man Festival, The Electric Picnic and the HMV Forum, London.

She sang lead vocals on The Amorphous Androgynous Oasis reissue of Falling Down and was also invited to sing lead vocals on The Amorphous Androgynous' "Let It Be track" on the Let It Be Revisited album issued on CD and vinyl by Mojo magazine in 2010.

Sufit is the author of a novel entitled Falling Upwards, and also the author of a collection of poetry entitled Moon Clippings.

In 2015, Sufit contributed two tracks to the anti-war pro-peace Not In Our Name CD – a song entitled "Mr Blair" and a poem entitled "Bliar", the latter read by David Erdos.

== Discography ==
=== Albums ===
- Magic Carpet – 1972 and 1993
- Love and the Maiden – 1974
- Alisha Through The Looking Glass – 1993
- Once Moor – Magic Carpet 2 – 1996
- Not in Our Name CD – 2015

=== Compilations, contributions ===
- Women of Heart and Mind
- Many Bright Things – 2005
- A Monstrous Psychedelic Bubble Exploding in Your Mind, Volume 1 – 2008
- Falling Down (vocals) Amorphous Androgynous remix commissioned by Oasis
- Let It Be Revisited / Let It Be – 2010
