= Large as Life and Twice as Natural =

Studio album by Davey Graham
- Released: 1968
- Genre: Folk, blues, jazz
- Label: London
- Producer: Ray Horricks

Davey Graham chronology
Midnight Man (1966)	Large as Life and Twice as Natural (1968)	Hat (1969)

Large as Life and Twice as Natural is an album by British musician Davey Graham, released in 1968.

== Reception ==
Professional ratings
Review scores
Source	Rating
Allmusic	4.5/5 stars

In his Allmusic review, critic Ritchie Unterberger wrote, "With the exception of 1964's Folk, Blues and Beyond, this is Graham's finest non-compilation album... The raga-jazz interpretation of Joni Mitchell's "Both Sides Now," which moves from meditative opening drones into a freewheeling explosion of modal folk-rock is one of the highlights of Graham's career on record and one of the best expressions of his ability to make a standard his own."

== Track listing ==
1. "Both Sides, Now" (Joni Mitchell) – 6:02
2. "Bad Boy Blues" (Davy Graham) – 2:17
3. "Tristano" (Davy Graham) – 4:00
4. "Babe, It Ain't No Lie" (Elizabeth Cotten) – 2:27
5. "Bruton Town" (Traditional) – 3:59
6. "Sunshine Raga" (Davy Graham) – 6:19
7. "Freight Train Blues" (John Lair, Bob Dylan) – 4:04
8. "Jenra" (Davy Graham) – 3:10
9. "Electric Chair" (Davy Graham) – 2:45
10. "Good Morning Blues" (Lead Belly)– 5:23
11. "Beautiful City" (Davy Graham) – 2:28
12. "Blue Raga" (Ravi Shankar, Ali Akbar Khan) – 5:48

== Personnel ==
- Davey Graham – vocals, guitar
- Harold McNair – flute
- Dick Heckstall-Smith – saxophone
- Jon Hiseman – drums
- Danny Thompson – bass

Technical

- Bill Price - engineer
