= The Guitar Player =

Studio album by Davey Graham
- Released: 1963
- Genre: Folk jazz, jazz, blues
- Length: 58:13 (reissue)
- Label: Pye

Davey Graham chronology
| The Guitar Player (1963) | Folk, Blues and Beyond (1964) |

The Guitar Player is an album by British guitarist Davey Graham (then Davy Graham), released in 1963. It was his first LP after releasing the EP 3/4 A.D. one years earlier. The session-musician Bobby Graham (no relation) plays drums on the album.

"I started to play the guitar about seven years ago, while I was still at school- homework always gave in to music, so I was no genius! As soon as I got home, I would put on a blues record- Big Bill Broonzy, Blind Lemon Jefferson, Memphis Slim, Champion Jack Dupree and Muddy Waters and many others as well as modern jazz greats like Charlie Parker, Charlie Mingus and Thelonious Monk, who are still my favourites.

When I got tired of the city and a job suffocating in an office, I went to Paris and sang and played in the streets to cinema queues and up and down the French Riviera. I must admit I was very glad when I was invited to play in night clubs where I could put down the plectrum and play finger style as I still do. Every summer for three years I would break the chains of a job (anything from librarian to crate-humper) and leave for the continent, taking £5– the fare to Paris, freedom and the sun of the Cote d’Azur. When I came back to England in the winter of 1961, I started to get more regular work playing in folk song clubs, and got my first “break” playing as accompanist along with Alexis Korner for Shirley Abicair, the Australian folk singer on broadcasts for radio, a TV series and a concert at the Royal Festival Hall.

When people ask me what type of guitar I play, I usually say “Blues, bits and pieces”. The numbers on this album are a mixture of jazz and folk influences. I think that every number has its own particular mood. Before I play I don’t know exactly what notes will come out, but I know the mood the number conjures up in me, so that on the framework of, say, a 12-bar blues with a slow tempo and a minor key, I can make the guitar cry by whining the strings.

On the other hand, for a calypso or fast rocking blues, I can use running single-line phrases with clipped notes to convey movement and excitement, filling in with block chords to keep the pulse of the number. For me, the richness of the guitar as a solo instrument, or an accompaniment to a singer lies in its many voices and moods.

For the last two years, I have been playing in Nick’s diner near Earl’s Court where I eat excellent steaks and am acquiring a taste for good wine and cigars! Over the past year I have made half a dozen solo TV appearances, though I love to play with a band. I have recently joined Alexis’ “Blues Incorporated” and have a ball both playing, and watching the dancers. All is said now except that I sincerely hope you enjoy this record either to listen to, or as a background to good conversation!"

- Davy Graham 1963

It was reissued in 2003 on CD by Sanctuary Records with eight bonus tracks. It was also released as The Guitar Player... Plus.

== Reception ==
Professional ratings
Review scores
| Source | Rating |
|---|---|
| Allmusic | 5/5 stars |

In his Allmusic review, critic Thom Jurek wrote, "The Guitar Player is one of the greatest, if not the greatest, instrumental acoustic guitar record of the 1960s and 1970s British folk scene... the release of the classic The Guitar Player in America, some 40 years after its initial issue, is still an occasion for great celebration and is a candidate for reissue of the year."

== Track listing ==
1. "Don't Stop the Carnival" (Traditional) – 1:54
2. "Sermonette" (Cannonball Adderley) – 2:45
3. "Take Five" (Paul Desmond) – 1:55
4. "How Long, How Long Blues" (Leroy Carr) – 2:25
5. "Sunset Eyes" (Sherman Edwards, Sid Wayne) – 1:53
6. "Cry Me a River" (Arthur Hamilton) – 2:19
7. "The Ruby & the Pearl" (Bill Evans, Jay Livingston) – 2:27
8. "Buffalo" (Kenny Dorham) – 2:17
9. "Exodus" (Ernest Gold) – 1:57
10. "Yellow Bird" (Alan Bergman, Marilyn Keith, Norman Luboff) – 2:19
11. "Blues for Betty" (Davy Graham) – 3:27
12. "Hallelujah, I Love Her So" (Ray Charles) – 2:00
  2003 reissue bonus tracks:
13. "She Moved Thru' the Bizarre/Blue Raga" Live (Colum, Traditional) – 7:43
14. "Misirlou" Live (Nick Roubanis, Bob Russell, Fred Wise, Milton Leeds) – 3:27
15. "Hey! Bud Blues" Live (Big Bill Broonzy) – 6:15
16. "Anji" (Davy Graham) – 1:27
17. "Fingerbuster" (Davy Graham) – 1:54
18. "La Morena" (Davy Graham) – 3:45
19. "Happy Meeting in Glory" (Traditional; arranged by Davy Graham) – 2:08
20. "Suite in D Minor" (Robert de Visée) – 3:56

== Personnel ==
- Davey Graham – guitar
- Bobby Graham - drums
- Alexis Korner - guitar on "3/4 A.D."
