= Conradus de Pistoria =

15th-century Italian composer

Conradus de Pistoria (also Coradus, de Pistoia, de Pistoja) (fl. early 15th century) was an Italian composer of the late medieval era and early Renaissance, active in Florence and elsewhere in northern Italy. He is listed in the standard histories of music for the period, including the New Oxford History of Music: Ars Nova and the Renaissance, 1300–1540, and the New Grove. Conradus was an Italian representative of the manneristic school of composers known as the ars subtilior, closely associated with the courts of the schismatic popes during the period of the Avignon Papacy.

== Life and career ==
Next to nothing is known about his life, but for a few inferences, and one archival reference. Probably he was associated with Antipope Alexander V and Antipope John XXIII. Conradus's two known works appear in a manuscript assembled in Bologna, where Alexander V died in May 1410. Prior to coming to Bologna but after his election to the schismatic papacy in 1409, Alexander had been in Pistoia, Conradus's likely birthplace. Conradus was probably a singer at San Reparata in Florence, where employment records show he joined the choir in December 1410. The new antipope, newly arrived in Florence in late 1410, had a close connection with the Medici family, and Conradus was probably associated with his court as well.

In addition to being a composer, Conradus was a friar of the Augustinian order.

Two of his compositions survive, both three-voice ballades. One is on a Latin text indicating his association with a papal court; the other is a secular work in French. Both are examples of ars subtilior writing.

== Works ==
Both works are found in the Modena Codex (Mod A M 5.24). They can be found in a modern edition in Corpus mensurabilis musicae, vol. 53/1–3.

- "Veri almi pastoris musicale collegium" (ballade; 3 voices)
- "Se doulz espour ne me donne confort" (ballade; 3 voices)
