= Holly Kaleidoscope =

Studio album by Davy Graham
- Released: 1970
- Genre: Folk, blues, jazz
- Label: Decca
- Producer: Ray Horricks

Davy Graham chronology
Hat (1969)	Holly Kaleidoscope (1970)	Godington Boundary (1970)

Holly Kaleidoscope is an album by British musician Davy Graham, released in 1970. His wife at the time, Holly Gwyn, contributes on vocals.

== Reception ==
Professional ratings
Review scores
Source	Rating
Allmusic	3/5 stars

In his Allmusic review, critic Ritchie Unterberger wrote, "Graham's final Decca LP was co-billed to his wife at the time, Holly Gwyn (credited simply as "Holly"), although she only appears on a few tracks... it's not one of Graham's more notable albums, but it's respectable, and the guitar work, of course, is nothing less than stellar."

== Track listing ==
1. "Flower Never Bend With the Rainfall" (Paul Simon) – 2:48
2. "Wilt Thou Unkind" (Davy Graham) – 0:55
3. "Blackbird" (John Lennon, Paul McCartney) – 2:19
4. "Blues at Gino's" (Davy Graham) – 3:58
5. "Since I Fell for You" (Buddy Johnson) – 2:49
6. "Sunny Moon for Two" (Sonny Rollins) – 3:04
7. "Fingerbuster" (Davy Graham) – 1:33
8. "Here, There and Everywhere" (John Lennon, Paul McCartney) – 2:33
9. "Ramblin' Sailor" (Davy Graham) – 1:21
10. "Mary, Open the Door" (Duffy Power) – 2:01
11. "I Know My Love" (Traditional; arranged by Holly Gwin) – 2:48
12. "Charlie" (Davy Graham) – 2:43
13. "Bridge Over Troubled Water" (Paul Simon) – 3:08
14. "Little Man You've Had a Busy Day" (Maurice Sigler, Al Hoffman, Mabel Wayne) – 1:41

== Personnel ==
- Davy Graham – vocals, guitar
- Holly Gwyn – vocals

Technical

- Terry Johnson - engineer
- David Wedgbury - photography
