= Hat (Davy Graham album) =

Studio album by Davy Graham
- Released: 1969
- Genre: Folk, blues, jazz
- Label: Decca
- Producer: Ray Horricks

Davy Graham chronology
Large as Life and Twice as Natural (1968)	Hat (1969)	Holly Kaleidoscope (1970)

Hat is an album by British musician Davy Graham, released in 1969.

== Reception ==
Professional ratings
Review scores
Source	Rating
Allmusic	3/5 stars

In his Allmusic review, critic Ritchie Unterberger wrote, "There's no such thing as a bad Graham album from the 1960s. While Hat isn't necessarily the first one you should dig into, it offers the standard pleasures that you expect from his records: excellent, feverishly imaginative acoustic guitar playing..."

== Track listing ==
1. "Getting Better" (John Lennon, Paul McCartney) – 2:03
2. "Lotus Blossom" (Sam Coslow, Arthur Johnston) – 2:29
3. "I'm Ready" (Willie Dixon) – 2:32
4. "Buhaina Chant" (Art Blakey) – 2:34
5. "Homeward Bound" (Paul Simon) – 2:21
6. "Love Is Pleasing" (Traditional) – 2:16
7. "Hornpipe for Harpsichord, Played Upon Guitar" (Henry Purcell) – 1:31
8. "Down Along the Cove" (Bob Dylan) – 2:13
9. "Hoochie Coochie Man" (Willie Dixon) – 3:38
10. "Stan's Guitar" (Stanley Albert Watson) – 2:23
11. "Pretty Polly" (Traditional) – 3:26
12. "Bulgarian Dance" (Traditional) – 3:21
13. "I Am a Rock" (Paul Simon) – 2:20
14. "Oliver" (Oliver Hunt) – 1:37

== Personnel ==
- Davy Graham – vocals, guitar
- Danny Thompson – bass

Technical

- Terry Johnson - engineer
