= Folk, Blues and Beyond =

Studio album by Davey Graham
- Released: January 1965
- Genres: Folk, folk baroque, progressive folk, raga rock, blues, jazz
- Length: 44:26
- Label: Decca
- Producer: Ray Horricks

Davey Graham chronology
The Guitar Player (1963)	Folk, Blues and Beyond (1965)	Midnight Man (1966)

Folk, Blues and Beyond is the second studio album by British musician Davy Graham, originally released in 1965. It has been considered Graham's most groundbreaking and consistent work and a defining record of the 20th century. It has also been a primary influence on some of the most popular musicians in Britain ranging from Bert Jansch to Jimmy Page and Eric Clapton.

== Background ==
Graham's first album, The Guitar Player, was almost exclusively jazz based. He was also known for his collaborations with folksinger Shirley Collins, which had established his name in the purist folk communities in Britain.

Most of the tracks on the album are a fusion of traditional western folk/blues and Middle-Eastern music. This synthesis of world sounds was inspired by Graham's frequent traveling across the Asian continent from the early 1950s onward.

Graham also utilizes jazz progressions to re-innovate and contemporize traditional sounds, especially on the blues tracks of the album. For example, the opening track is a cover of "Leavin' Blues", written by Lead Belly, which is a straightforward blues in C. Graham's version uses the DADGAD guitar tuning, and he speeds up the tempo to give it a more 'rocking' sound. His cover is also infused with an exotic, middle eastern sound, accredited to both the tuning and the exotic musical scales he uses throughout the song.

In 2005, a remastered CD version of the album was released in the UK.

== Reception ==
Professional ratings
Review scores
Source	Rating
Allmusic	4.5/5 stars
Record Mirror	4/5 stars

In his Allmusic review, critic Richie Unterberger wrote "This was Graham's most groundbreaking and consistent album. More than his solo debut The Guitar Player (which was pretty jazzy) or his previous collaboration with folk singer Shirley Collins, Folk Roots, New Routes, this established his mixture of folk, jazz, blues, and Middle Eastern music, the use of a bassist and drummer also hinting at (though not quite reaching) folk-rock... If there is one aspect of the recording to criticize, it is, as was usually the case with Graham, the thin, colorless vocals. The guitar playing is the main attraction, though; it's so stellar that it makes the less impressive singing easy to overlook. Ten of the 16 songs were included on the compilation Folk Blues and All Points in Between, but Graham fans should get this anyway, as the level of material and musicianship is pretty high throughout most of the disc."

== Track listing ==
1. "Leavin' Blues" (Lead Belly)
2. "Cocaine" (Reverend Gary Davis)
3. "Sally Free and Easy" (Cyril Tawney)
4. "Black Is the Colour of My True Love's Hair" (Traditional; arranged by Davy Graham)
5. "Rock Me Baby" (Big Bill Broonzy)
6. "Seven Gypsies" (Traditional; arranged by Davy Graham)
7. "Ballad of the Sad Young Men" (Fran Landesman, Tommy Wolf)
8. "Moanin'" (Bobby Timmons, Jon Hendricks)
9. "Skillet (Good'n'Greasy)" (Traditional; arranged by Davy Graham)
10. "Ain't Nobody's Business What I Do" (Porter Grainger, Everett Robbins)
11. "Maajun (A Taste of Tangier)" (Davy Graham)
12. "I Can't Keep from Cryin' Sometimes" (Blind Willie Johnson)
13. "Don't Think Twice, It's All Right" (Bob Dylan)
14. "My Babe" (Willie Dixon)
15. "Goin' Down Slow" (Jimmy Oden)
16. "Better Get Hit in Yo' Soul" (Charles Mingus)
  2005 reissue bonus tracks:
17. "She Moved Through the Fair" (Traditional; arranged by Davy Graham)
18. "Mustapha" (Traditional; arranged by Davy Graham)
19. "Anji" (Davy Graham)
20. "Davy's Train Blues" (Davy Graham)
21. "3/4 A.D." (Davy Graham, Alexis Korner)

== Personnel ==
- Davy Graham - vocals, acoustic guitar
- Tony Reeves - double bass
- Barry Morgan - drums, percussion

Technical

- Gus Dudgeon - recording engineer
- Crispian Woodgate - photography
