= Craicmore =

American contemporary Celtic music band

- Origin: Los Angeles, California, United States
- Genres: Celtic, Folk
- Years active: 1995–present
- Labels: Kilts On Productions, Knudsen Productions
- Members: Nancy Johnston; John MacAdams; Dave Champagne; Sean Faye-Cullen
- Past members: Pat Collins (deceased); Sue Draheim (deceased); Bryan Ogihara; Tim Foley; Dave Soyars; Steve Pribyl; Simon Watkins; Richard Cooke
- Website: www.craicmore.com

Craicmore (krặk•mor) is a contemporary Celtic music band from Los Angeles, California. The band is known for its original musical arrangements, built around traditional Irish and Scottish songs and tunes. Craicmore performs throughout the United States, and has toured internationally. Craicmore's music has been featured on TV shows like Without A Trace, How I Met Your Mother, and Days of Our Lives. In 2013, the band consisted of Nancy Johnston (lead vocals, percussion), John MacAdams (guitar, percussion, didgeridoo and backing vocals), Dave Champagne (bagpipes, woodwinds and backing vocals), and Sean Faye-Cullen (bass and backing vocals).

== Background ==
Craicmore was formed in the early 90s by a group of seisiún musicians at the Los Angeles Celtic Arts Center. As such, the group got its start performing at Irish Festivals, Highland Games, and local watering holes. They found early success in the form of critical acclaim and a growing fan base. With the death of founding member Pat Collins, the band restructured and left the fairs for performing arts centers. Anchored by "Nancy Johnston's lovely, deep alto voice and the band's beautiful and sensitive arrangements." Craicmore has released 3 studio albums, O', Too Bad For Heaven, Too Good For Hell, and From Hill and Hoolie. Each release building on the success of the one before, the playlists include original interpretations of classic Irish tunes like "Humours of Ballyloughlin" and arrangements of songs like Robbie Burns' "Brose and Butter". Craicmore has had the opportunity to work with notable guest musicians for studio performances, live performances, and album features. These guests include: Kathleen Keane (Appearing on FH&H) and Sue Draheim (appearing on TBFHTGFH). Constant throughout has been MacAdams' "innovative production." This production, combined with "Johnston's deep contralto," has allowed Craicmore to produce consistent, quality music for its fans. Craicmore is working on a 4th studio album.

== Celtic Connections ==
In today’s multi-cultural society, Craicmore's Arts in Education program "Celtic Connections" aims to bring a message of cultural diversity, demonstrating how Celtic music has accepted many global influences while retaining its fundamental traditions. The standards-based, 30–50 minute assembly style, interactive program has reached over 60,000 K–12 students. Drawing upon Johnston's 25 year career in education, the program serves to educate young students about Celtic music and history

== Discography ==
- 1999: O
- 2002: Too Bad For Heaven, Too Good For Hell
- 2009: From Hill and Hoolie
