= Thomas Fabri =

Franco-Flemish musician

Thomas Fabri (c. 1380 – c. 1420) was a composer from the Southern Netherlands (Flanders), who worked during the early 15th century.

== Biography ==
Fabri was a student of Jean de Noyers alias Tapissier in Paris and of Johannes Ecghaert in Brugge (Bruges), at least if we may believe the partition of his 'Gloria', where he is described as 'scolaris Tapissier'. Fabri became choir master at the Saint Donatien Church (Sint-Donatiuskerk) in Brugge in 1412.

Only four of his works have been preserved in foreign sources. Two works are settings in three parts on Dutch lyrics. They may have been written down by a German in a song book (perhaps at the Council of Constance) that has been illustrated by an Italian and is kept now in the Abbey of Heiligenkreuz.

== Works ==
- Ach vlaendere vrie (rondeau)
- Die mey so lieflic wol ghebloit (ballade)
- Gloria (Bologna, Civico Museo Bibliografico Musicale, Ms Q)
- Sinceram salutem care mando vobis (antiphone)

== Discography ==
- Direct link to the search results for 'Thomas Fabri' on www.medieval.org
- 1996 – Oh Flanders Free. Music of the Flemish Renaissance: Ockeghem, Josquin, Susato, De la Rue. Capilla Flamenca. Alamire LUB 03, Naxos 8.554516. Contains a recording of "Ach Vlaendre vrie" by Thomas Fabri.
- 2009 – En un gardin. Les quatre saisons de l'Ars Nova. Manuscrits de Stavelot, Mons, Utrecht, Leiden. Capilla Flamenca. MEW 0852. Contains a recording of "Sinceram salutem care" by Thomas Fabri.
- 2013 – Dutch! Ars Nova songs in Dutch, Fortuna, Aliud APCD BE 004-2. Contains all the secular works.

== Sources ==
- Site of the La Trobe University
