= Earl Okin =

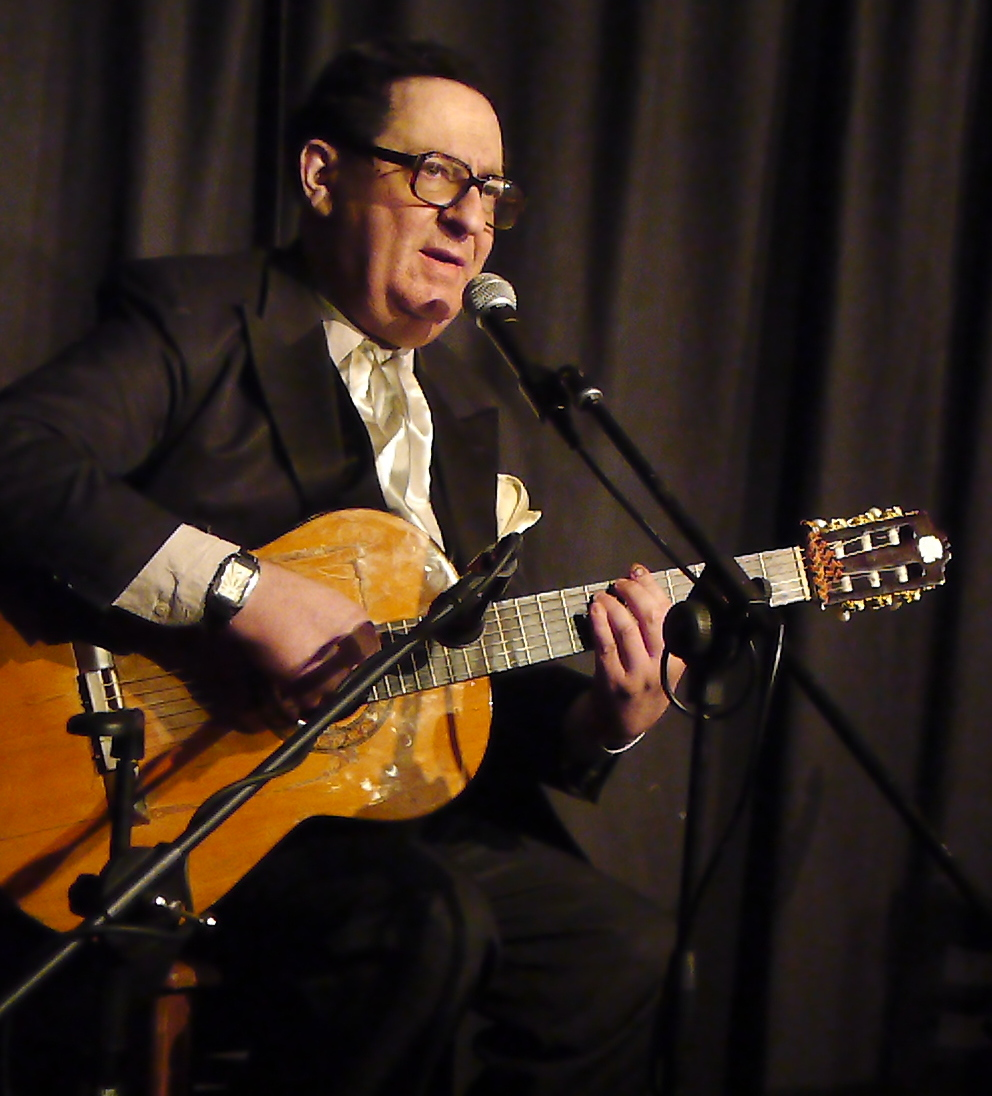
- Okin performing in 2014

Background information
- Born: 31 January 1947 (age 79); Surrey, England
- Genres: Jazz, bossa nova
- Instruments: Guitar, vocals (including mouth trumpet), piano
- Years active: 1967–present
- Labels: Sony
- Website: earlokin.net

Earl Okin (born 31 January 1947) is an English singer-songwriter, musician and comedian.

== Life and career ==
Born in Carshalton, Surrey, Okin has lived in Notting Hill since he was six years old. He holds a degree in philosophy from the University of Kent at Canterbury (1968) and worked as a schoolmaster for 11 years before being invited on a 1979 tour with Paul McCartney & Wings. By that time, he had reached the level of deputy headmaster.

Okin recorded his first single at Abbey Road in 1967. Some of his songs were covered during the 1960s by Cilla Black, Georgie Fame and Helen Shapiro, the latter recording now popular within the world of Northern Soul.

During the 1970s, Okin started to perform as a support act in large venues. Beginning with folk acts such as Ralph McTell and Fairport Convention, he progressed to open for such varied performers as Jean-Luc Ponty and Van Morrison. However, it was the tour with Wings which prompted him to pursue his musical career full-time. He also began to perform at jazz festivals.

In 1981, he appeared on Parkinson and was invited by Nigel Planer to perform at the Comic Strip. This led to his second career on the "alternative comedy" circuit where he remains a headline act. However, his act continues to be primarily musical. He has never performed stand-up. Fans' favourite comedy songs of his are "Mango", "Bessie" and "My Room".

In 1983, he began to perform at the Edinburgh Festival Fringe where he performed over 500 shows. However, hating what had become of the Fringe, he ceased performing there in 2000.

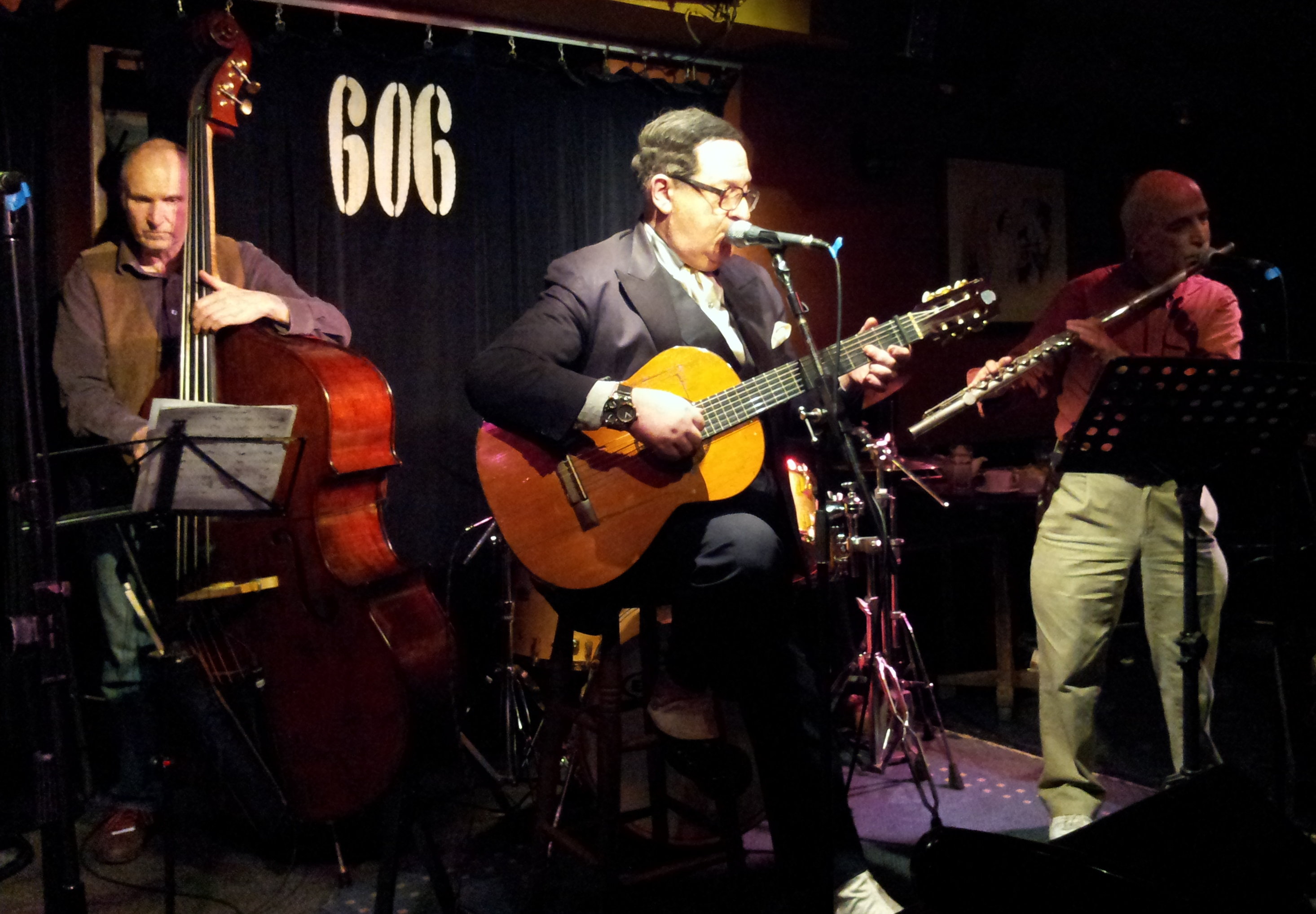
Simon Woolf (bass), Okin (guitar) Michèle Drees (drums) hidden, and Steve Rubie (flute) at the 606 Club on 10 January 2016

Okin continues to work as a songwriter and jazz singer/musician, with a particular interest in Bossa Nova. He gives concerts in Brazil from time to time, as well as touring his one-man show, a mixture of music and comedy, worldwide. He has performed in New York at Birdland, The Apollo and other jazz venues, but, not forgetting his comedy side, also at Caroline's. In addition he toured India, Singapore, and other nearby countries. He has also performed at most major venues in London, including Ronnie Scott's Jazz Club, the Royal Albert Hall and Royal Festival Hall, The Palladium and Wembley Arena.

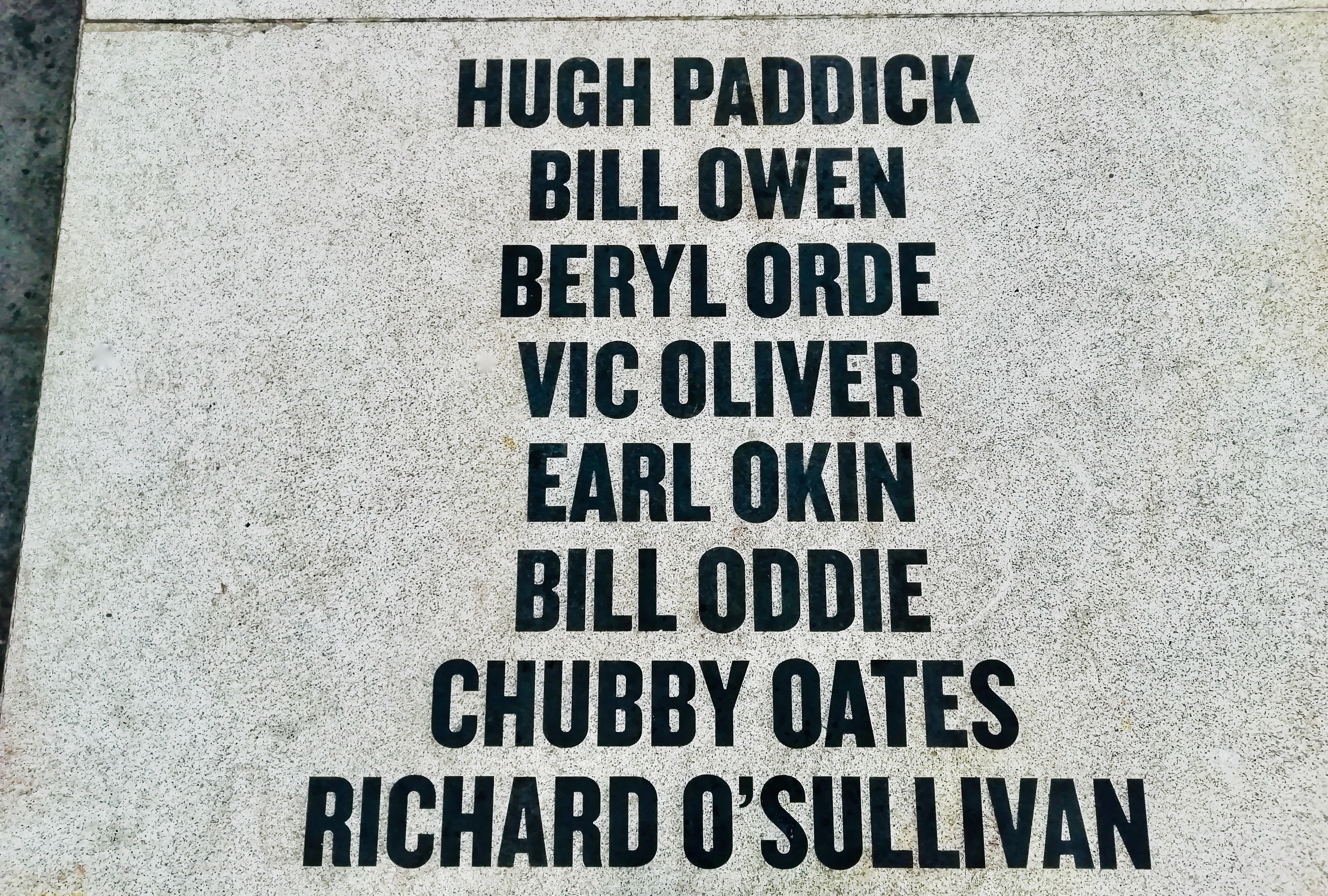
Earl Okin on Blackpool's Walk of Fame Comedy Carpet, 2022

Okin has performed on TV in several countries, including Brazil, Australia and Germany.

Apart from self-published LPs, he has had CDs issued by the Bertelsmann Music Group in Germany and Austria and Sony in the UK. He has completed two CDs, one of Jazz and Bossa Nova, Bossa Britanica, and more recently a CD of his songs in various genres called, after the recording studio, Songs From A Garden Shed and a similarly named follow-up album.

In 2012–13, Okin completed his autobiography, Earl's Caught, and a musical (in conjunction with the late Jackie Skarvellis), called A Harlem Story. He has also written a six-movement symphony.

In 2017 the biographical documentary Who is Earl Okin? was presented in festivals and selected theatres.

== Discography ==
=== Singles ===
- "Yellow Petals", Parlophone (1967)
- "Stop! And You Will Become Aware", CBS (1969)

=== Albums ===
- Mr Okin Comes To Town (1978), Folkland Records FL 1014
- Himself (1981), Whoopee Records WP 107 LP
- Earl's Caught (1986), Waterfront Records WFO 27
- Dancing Shoes (1989), Spats Music Ltd SPATS 1
- The Vienna Concerts (1996), Spray Records 74321344392
- "British But Sexy", Pate (1998)
- Bossa Britanica (1999), Preiser Records PR90804
- Live in Freiburg (2001), Spats Music Ltd
- Musical Genius and Sex Symbol (2004), Columbia 5152852
- Songs From A Garden Shed (2006)
- Not in Our Name (2015) (One track only)
- Songs From Another Shed (2018)
- Songs From A Basement (2019)
- Jazz From A Basement (2021)
- Earl Sings Duke (2022)
- Smooth Since 1947 (2023)
