= The Lady and the Unicorn (album) =

Studio album by John Renbourn
- Released: 1970
- Recorded: 1970
- Genre: Folk, folk rock
- Length: 35:14
- Label: Transatlantic Records (U.K.); Reprise (U.S./Canada) Windham Hill Records (1986)
- Producer: Bill Leader

John Renbourn chronology
Sir John Alot of Merrie Englandes Musyk Thyng and ye Grene Knyghte (1968)	The Lady and the Unicorn (1970)	Faro Annie (1971)

Professional ratings
Review scores
Source	Rating
Allmusic	3/5 stars

The Lady and the Unicorn is the 1970 solo album by British folk musician John Renbourn. On this release, Renbourn ventures into folk rock and medieval music territory. The first four tracks are arranged from the Add MS 29987 manuscript. The cover was taken from The Lady and the Unicorn tapestry.

== Track listing ==
- 1.1."Trotto" (Anonymous) – 0:40
- 1.2."Saltarrello" (Anonymous) – 1:53
- 2.1."Lamento Di Tristan" (Anonymous) – 1:58
- 2.2."La Rotta" (Anonymous) – 0:55
- 3.1."Veri Floris" (Anonymous) – 0:44
- 3.2."Triple Ballade (Sanscuer-Amordolens-Dameparvous)" (Guillaume de Machaut) – 2:00
- 4.1."Bransle Gay" (Claude Gervaise) – 1:13
- 4.2."Bransle De Bourgogne" (Robert Johnson)– 1:34
- 5.1."Alman" (Anonymous)– 1:25
- 5.2."Melancholy Galliard" (John Dowland) – 2:47
- 6."Sarabande" (Johann Sebastian Bach) – 2:41
- 7."The Lady And The Unicorn" (John Renbourn) – 3:21
- 8.1."My Johnny Was A Shoemaker" (Traditional) – 4:16
- 8.2."Westron Wynde" (Traditional) – 1:25
- 8.3."Scarborough Fair" (Traditional) – 7:22

== Personnel ==
- John Renbourn – guitar, sitar
- Terry Cox – hand drums, glockenspiel
- Lea Nicholson – concertina
- Ray Warleigh – flute
- Tony Roberts – flute
- Don Harper – viola
- Dave Swarbrick – violin

== Production ==
- Producer: Bill Leader
- Liner notes: Colin Harper [reissue]
