= Rosso de Chollegrana =

Italian 14th century composer

Rosso de Chollegrana, also spelled Collegrana, was an Italian composer who flourished in the 14th century. His exact identity and origin are unknown. His only known composition, Tremando più che foglia, is a madrigal for two voices. It is part of the collection at the British Library (see British Library, Add MS 29987). Scholars speculate that he may have been active in music circles in Florence during the mid to late 14th century based on the style of this composition. It is possible that the Florentine doctor of medicine Magister Franciscus de Mercadellis de Chollegrana, who was a resident of that city from 1364 until his death in 1405, was the author of this piece. It has also been suggested that one of his children or a relative of his may have been the author.
