= A Maid in Bedlam =

Studio album by The John Renbourn Group
- Released: 1977
- Recorded: Livingston Studios, New Barnet, London
- Genre: Folk
- Label: Transatlantic

The John Renbourn Group chronology
A Maid in Bedlam (1977)	The Enchanted Garden (1980)

Professional ratings
Review scores
Source	Rating
Allmusic	4.5/5 stars

A Maid in Bedlam is a 1977 album by The John Renbourn Group. According to Allmusic, the album "works as a collection of music that inspired the members of Pentangle in their contemporary folk-rock, played by some members of that band and their associates."

== Track listing ==
All tracks Traditional; except where indicated

1. "Black Waterside" – 3:24
2. "Nacht Tanz/Shaeffertanz" (Tielman Susato) – 3:26
3. "A Maid in Bedlam" – 3:57
4. "Gypsy Dance/Jews Dance" (Hans Neusidler) – 3:27
5. "John Barleycorn" – 3:40
6. "Reynardine" – 3:23
7. "My Johnny was a Shoemaker" – 2:46
8. "Death and the Lady" – 3:21
9. "The Battle of Augrham/5 in a Line" – 5:49
10. "Talk About Suffering" – 3:29

== Personnel ==
The John Renbourn Group

- John Renbourn – guitars, vocals
- Tony Roberts – vocals, flute, recorders, oboe, piccolo flute
- Jacqui McShee – vocals
- Sue Draheim – fiddle, vocals
- Keshav Sathe – tabla, finger cymbals

Technical

- Nic Kinsey – engineer
