= Egidius de Francia =

Medieval French music theorist

Egidius de Francia (fl. mid-14th century; also Egidius de Murino or Magister Frater Egidius) was a French music theorist of medieval music, known for the short treatise De motettis componendis. He possibly was an Augustinian friar, as in a miniature illumination he is titled Magister Egidius Augustinus. Along with "Guilelmus de Francia", he was probably a friar at the Monastery of Santo Spirito in Florence.

Egidius de Murino is, with Philippus de Caserta, one possible author of the Tractatus figurarum, a practical guide to the notation of ars subtilior. Egidius was also the author of De modo componendi, a theoretical guide to motet writing.

He is featured in the Squarcialupi Codex, the British Library manuscript Add MS 29987 and the Modena Codex (often known with the sigla ModA).

He is considered as likely being distinct from another Egidius, who was a contemporary Italian poet. No composition can be certainly attributed to him, although he is potentially identifiable with another Egidius, a composer found in the Chantilly Codex.

It is not certain if there is any relation to Egidius de Aurelia (Egidius of Orleans), composer of "Alma Polis" and "Axe poli cum artica".

== Works ==
- Donna s'amor
- Alta Serena Luce
