= Egardus =

14th-century medieval European composer

Egardus (fl. 1400; also Engardus or Johannes Echgaerd) was a European Medieval composer of ars subtilior. Almost no information survives about his life, and only three of his works are known. A certain "Johannes Ecghaerd", who held chaplaincies in Bruges and Diksmuide, may be a possible match for Egardus. The extant works—a canon and two Glorias—appear to be less complex than music by mid-century composers, possibly because they date from either very early or very late in Egardus' career.

== Identity and career ==
A 1735 engraving of St Donatian's Cathedral in Bruges as it appeared about 270 years after Johannes Ecghaerd was appointed succentor in 1370

Little is known with certainty about his life. The enigma of his biography stems from a difficulty in knowing whether he was Flemish or Italian. A northern origin is suggested by his name, a copy of one of his works in a Flemish manuscript, and a possible citation of his music by Thomas Fabri. But with only one other exception, all of his works are found in Northern Italian manuscripts, and that exception, a Polish manuscript, has strong Italian connections. The most important biographical research on the composer was conducted by Reinhard Strohm, who notes that it was more common for Northern works (and composers) to travel to Italy than the opposite.

Strohm identifies a "Magister Johannes Ecghaerd" appointed as succentor of St Donatian's Cathedral (Sint-Donaaskathedraal) in Bruges in 1370 as a possible match for the composer. This appointment suggests to Strohm that Echgaerd would have been born by or before 1340. Strohm also finds connections to a work by Thomas Fabri, a Dutch composer, in the text of Furnos reliquisti, an unlikely coincidence if they were not working close to each other. Johannes Egardus held chaplaincies in Diksmuide and Bruges. The number of his pieces in Paduan manuscripts suggested to Strohm that he may have been resident there. Nino Pirrotta had suggested that he may have been one of the musicians in the papal court of Bologna c.1410. However, Pirrotta's evidence was based on the position of Egardus's works within the manuscript Mod A—a connection between manuscript and court now considered more tenuous, and not from the lists of singers in the Italian papal chapels: lists from which Egardus is absent.

== Music ==
Only three works by Egardus survive. A canon, Furnos reliquisti quare; Equum est et salutare is found in a single source, Mod A (Modena, Biblioteca Estense e Universitaria alpha.M.5.24). His other two works have a somewhat wider distribution. The Gloria with the trope "Spiritus et Alme" appears in three sources, Utrecht, Universiteitsbibliotheek 1846 (olim 37, independently discovered by Schmid and Strohm) and two sources from Padua, Biblioteca Universitaria: MSS Ba 2.2.a (formerly 1225, part of Pad D) and 1475 (part of Pad A). Both of the Paduan sources originally come from the Paduan abbey of Santa Giustina. An untroped Gloria appears in five independent sources: Warsaw, Biblioteka Narodowa, MS III.8054 (olim Biblioteka Krasiński 52, commonly called Kras.) f. 204v-205r, Mod A f. 21v-22r, a collection of sources in Grottaferrata and at Dartmouth College (f. Dv-4r), Padua Ba 2.2.a (1225), f. 1v, and, recently identified, in Udine, Archivio di Stato framm. 22 recto (part of Cividale A). (Note: N.B. the source list in Nosow 2001 contains several errors in addition to the omission of the source in Udine discovered after its publication.) In the Warsaw source, the work is labeled "Opus Egardi." In Mod A, "Egardus" is used. In no other source of this work is there an attribution. Strohm notes that Egardus's music is less complex than other mid-century composers, but this lack of complexity can either be attributed to an early date for its composition, contemporaneous with Philippe de Vitry, or a far later date, just prior to Johannes Ciconia).

=== Editions of music ===
Additional editions are listed in the critical notes of the Polyphonic Music of the Fourteenth Century editions:

- Fischer, Kurt von and F. Alberto Gallo, editors. Italian Sacred and Ceremonial Music, Polyphonic Music of the Fourteenth Century 12 (Monaco: Éditions de l'Oiseau-Lyre, 1976), p. 21 (untroped Gloria).
- Fischer, Kurt von and F. Alberto Gallo, editors. Italian Sacred and Ceremonial Music, Polyphonic Music of the Fourteenth Century 13 (Monaco: Éditions de l'Oiseau-Lyre, 1987), p. 90 (Gloria, "Spiritus et Alme"), 214 (Furnos reliquisti).
