= Egidius (Chantilly Codex composer) =

14th-century French composer

Egidius, sometimes Magister Egidius, (c. 1350-1400?) is an ars subtilior composer found in the Chantilly Codex and the Modena Codex. Works attributed to "Egidius" in the Chantilly Codex comprise the ballades Roses et lis and Courtois et sage, dedicated to Pope Clement VII in Avignon. He is potentially identifiable with Egidius de Murino, a composer and music theorist active at the same time.

Egidius de Aurelia (Egidius of Orleans), composer of "Alma Polis / Axe poli cum artica" is thought to be a different composer.
