= Faro Annie =

Studio album by John Renbourn
- Released: 1971
- Recorded: 1971
- Studio: Livingston, New Barnet, London
- Genre: Folk; folk rock
- Length: 41:35
- Label: Transatlantic (U.K.); Reprise (U.S./Canada)
- Producer: Bill Leader

John Renbourn chronology
The Lady and the Unicorn (1970)	Faro Annie (1971)	So Clear (1973)

Professional ratings
Review scores
Source	Rating
AllMusic	3.5/5 stars
Christgau's Record Guide	B+

Faro Annie is the 1971 solo album by British folk musician John Renbourn. On this release, Renbourn ventures into folk rock and blues territory. There is also heavy use of the sitar on this album, played by Renbourn himself. He is joined on the album by Pentangle bandmates Danny Thompson and Terry Cox.

== Track listing ==
Side one
No.	Title	Writer(s)	Length
1.	"White House Blues"	Traditional	3:38
2.	"Buffalo Skinners"	Traditional Woody Guthrie	3:40
3.	"Kokomo Blues"	Mississippi Fred McDowell, Kokomo Arnold, Traditional	3:56
4.	"Little Sadie"	Traditional	3:19
5.	"Shake Shake Mama"	Traditional	3:27

Side two
No.	Title	Writer(s)	Length
6.	"Willy O' Winsbury"	Traditional	5:39
7.	"The Cuckoo"	Traditional	3:59
8.	"Come On in My Kitchen"	Robert Johnson	3:54
9.	"Country Blues"	Traditional, Dock Boggs	3:38
10.	"Faro Annie"	John Renbourn, Danny Thompson, Terry Cox, Sue Draheim	3:27
11.	"Back on the Road Again"	Traditional, Ian Campbell	3:11
Total length:			41:35

== Personnel ==
- John Renbourn - guitar, sitar, harmonica, lead vocals
- Danny Thompson - bass on "Shake Shake Mamma" and "Faro Annie"
- Sue Draheim - fiddle on "Little Sadie", "Willy O'Winsbury" and "Country Blues"
- Pete Dyer - harmonica on "Kokomo Blues" and "Come On in My Kitchen"
- Terry Cox - drums on "Shake Shake Mamma" and "Faro Annie"
- Dorris Henderson - vocals on "White House Blues", "Kokomo Blues" and "Back on the Road Again"

== Production ==
- Producer: Bill Leader
- Recording Engineer: Nic Kinsey
- Art Direction: John Ashcroft
- Photography: Shepard Sherbell, Janet Kerr
- Liner notes: Colin Harper
