= Midnight Man (album) =

Studio album by Davey Graham
- Released: 1966
- Genre: Folk, blues, jazz
- Length: 37:53
- Label: Decca
- Producer: Ray Horricks

Davey Graham chronology
Folk, Blues and Beyond (1964)	Midnight Man (1966)	Large as Life and Twice as Natural (1968)

Midnight Man is an album by British musician Davey Graham, released in 1966.

== Reception ==
Professional ratings
Review scores
Source	Rating
Allmusic	4.5/5 stars

In his Allmusic review, critic Ritchie Unterberger wrote, "Graham went into a somewhat harder-rocking bluesy groove on this record, though a strong jazz feel was always present in the rhythm especially. More than any other Graham LP, this offers proof that the guitarist would have established himself as a major star on the folk circuit in the '60s -- if only his singing was better. As a guitarist, he's simply wonderful, combining folk, jazz, and blues styles into an invigorating, idiosyncratic style that can both swing and attain a delicate sadness. As an interpreter, he's relentlessly imaginative, breathing new vigor into overdone R&B standards, or devising fresh folk arrangements for Beatles and Paul Simon tunes."

== Track listing ==
1. "No Preacher Blues" (Davey Graham) – 2:18
2. "The Fakir" (Lalo Schifrin) – 4:15
3. "I'm Looking Thru' You" (John Lennon, Paul McCartney) – 2:06
4. "Hummingbird" (Davy Graham) – 2:42
5. "Watermelon Man" (Herbie Hancock) – 3:02
6. "Stormy Monday" (Traditional; arranged by Davey Graham) – 3:41
7. "Money Honey" (Jesse Stone) – 2:28
8. "Walkin' the Dog" (Rufus Thomas) – 2:41
9. "Fire in My Soul" (Blind Willie Johnson) – 1:55
10. "Lost Lover Blues" (Traditional; arranged by Davey Graham) – 2:08
11. "Neighbour Neighbour" (Jimmy Hughes, Alton Valier) – 2:37
12. "Jubilation" (Junior Mance) – 1:49
13. "Rags and Old Iron" (Oscar Brown, Jr., King Curtis) – 3:24
14. "Jelly Roll Baker" (Lonnie Johnson) – 2:45

== Personnel ==
- Davey Graham – vocals, guitar
- Tony Reeves - bass on "The Fakir"
- Barry Morgan - drums on "The Fakir"

Technical

- Gus Dudgeon - engineer
