= Sue Draheim =

American fiddler (1949–2013)

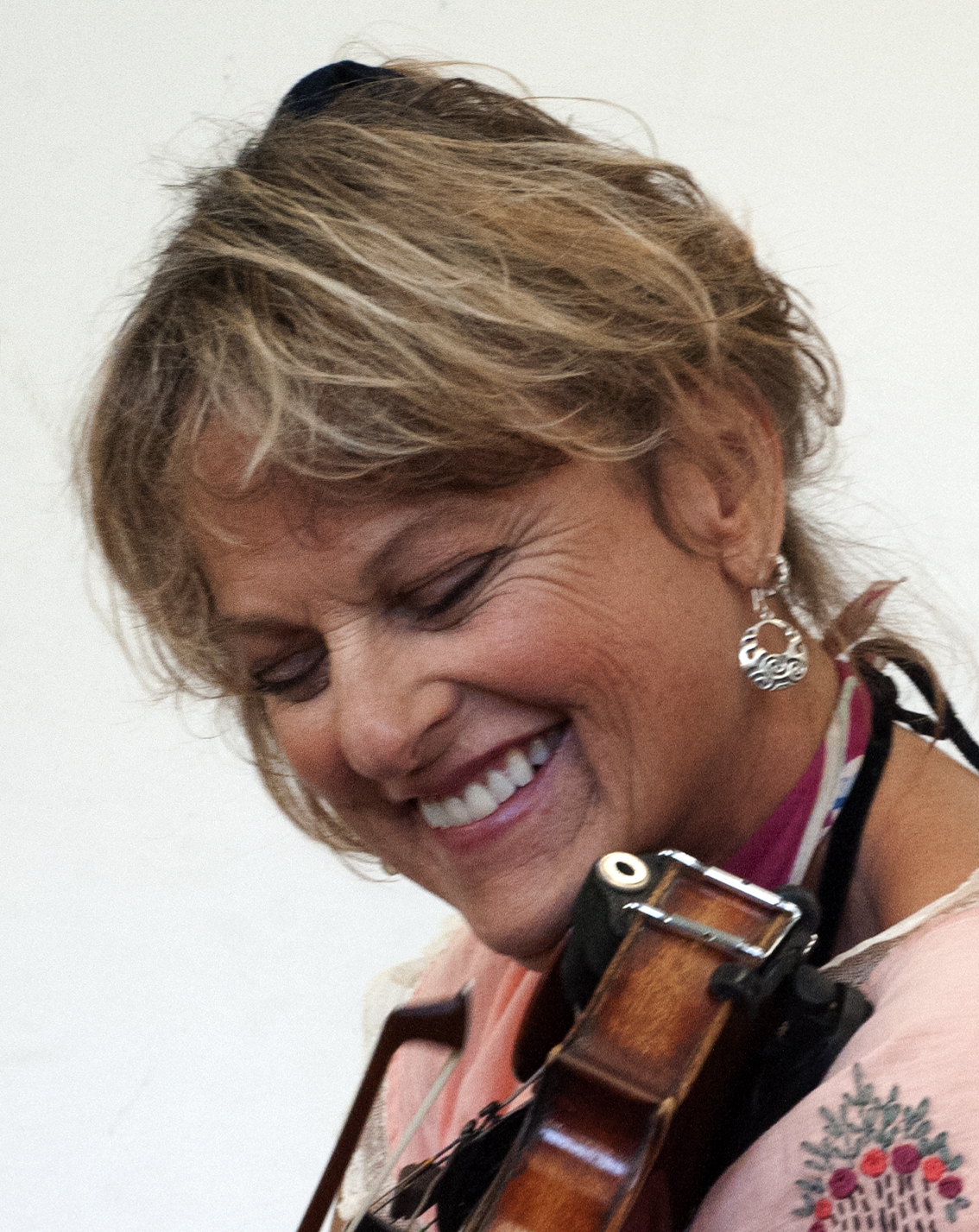
- Draheim in San Francisco, 2011

Background information
- Born: Susan Ann Draheim; August 17, 1949; Oakland, California, U.S.
- Died: April 11, 2013 (aged 63) Berea, Kentucky, U.S.
- Genres: Folk rock, Celtic, Old Time, Cajun, Zydeco, Classical
- Occupations: Fiddler, singer, composer
- Instruments: Fiddle, violin, viola, voice
- Years active: 1967–2013
- Labels: Arhoolie, Transatlantic, Island, etc.
- Website: suedraheim.com/music

Sue Draheim (/ˈdrɔːhaɪm/ DRAW-hyme; August 17, 1949 – April 11, 2013) was an American fiddler, boasting a more than forty year musical career in the US and the UK. Growing up in North Oakland, Draheim began her first private violin lessons at age eleven, having started public school violin instruction at age eight while attending North Oakland's Peralta Elementary School. She also attended Claremont Jr. High, and graduated from Oakland Technical High School in 1967.

Originally trained as a classical violinist, Draheim became involved in many other genres and recorded albums with groups representing Cajun, Old Time, country, Zydeco, folk jazz, Irish and British folk music. Early on in her career, Celtic fiddle became Draheim's major focus.

While Draheim was primarily a fiddler, she never lost touch with her classical training, and was a member of the Berkeley Symphony Orchestra and the Bay Area Women's Philharmonic as well as UC Berkeley's University Chamber Chorus; Draheim, along with fiddler Kerry Parker, also "augmented" the harp trio "Trillium". She also played in the US premiere of Frank Zappa's experimental orchestral piece A Zappa Affair. She was described by Gael Alcock, cellist/composer with whom she performed one of Alcock's pieces, as "fiddler extraordinaire".

== Late 1960s to early 1970s in the US ==
In the late 1960s, Draheim moved to a North Oakland house well known in the Bay Area music community and called simply "Colby Street". This move proved to be a decisive one in terms of her musical career as it was where she changed from a "violinist" into a "fiddler". In writing her short biography in 1970 to accompany the album notes for Berkeley Farms, Draheim gives us some background on that transition:

I've lived around the Bay Area most of my life. There wasn't much money at home. I had to talk my parents into letting me take fiddle lessons. I started that when I was eight years old. This was public school instruction. After three years of that, I began private lessons. I stopped when I was fourteen, and didn't touch the violin until I was 19. I moved to Colby Street when I was eighteen years old. It was there that I met Jim Bamford. He taught me my first fiddle tunes (as opposed to the classical violin music I'd learned). This was in 1967.

Draheim quickly got involved in American mountain string band music, forming a group called the "Diesel Duck Revue" in 1967 with Mac Benford, Hank Bradley, Sue Rosenberg, and Rick Shubb, performing with them at Berkeley's Freight & Salvage in 1968.

At about the same time she started playing with a Colby Street group that, when she performed with them at the Sky River Rock Festival (Tenino, Washington in 1968 and 1969), called themselves "Dr. Humbead's New Tranquility String Band and Medicine Show". The band consisted of Sue Draheim, Jim Bamford, Mac Benford, and Will Spires and owed its name to their manager and sound man Earl Crabb (aka "The Great Humbead"); by the time Mike Seeger arranged for them to be recorded for the Folkways Berkeley Farms album in 1970, they'd shortened the charming but cumbersome name to simply "The New Tranquility String Band". Performing with the band, her photograph appeared on the poster for the 1968 Berkeley Folk Music Festival. Draheim and Dr. Humbead's New Tranquility String Band also appeared at the 1969 Third Annual San Diego State Folk Festival; links to recordings of their performance there are provided on folkartsrarerecords.com's website.

Colby Street housed other groups as well, one of them being the "Golden Toad", featuring mandolinist and guitarist Will Spires; she joined them for the summer solstice concert at Grace Cathedral in 1970. In 1970, Joe Cooley, Irish button accordion player who was living in San Francisco at the time, visited the Colby Street house and that was the beginning of Draheim's lifelong attachment to Irish music. She and others joined Cooley to perform Saturday nights at San Francisco's long-standing Irish pub, the Harrington Bar, making up the band which they called "Gráinneog Céilidh." Years later, Draheim's command of the Irish folk music idiom as well as her versatility in other genres would prompt one fan to comment: "And that is a very apt illustration of the point: Sue Draheim, a classically-trained violinist who has been mistaken for a real-deal Sligo fiddler who nowadays has a chair in a San Francisco symphony orchestra as well as playing in old timey bands".

In 1970 Draheim also got involved with several musicians at what was known as Sweets Mill Music Camp, about 200 miles east of Oakland on the edge of the Sierra National Forest. It was there that she played with legendary Delta blues guitarist Sam Chatmon in a group called the "California Sheiks" (named after Chatmon's back-home group, the "Mississippi Sheiks". Some recordings of Draheim and Chatmon from that period are known to have survived: one, a 7-inch mono tape reel holding eighteen songs and labelled "Box 3, Item 2007.04sdff070" in the UCLA Ethnomusicology Archive (which misspelled her name as "Drahiem"), and the other, one song (which is not found in UCLA's collection) which was released in CD form in 1999 as part of a Sam Chatmon retrospective.

== Early to late 1970s in the UK ==
From late 1970 to early 1977 Draheim lived in England, where her talents as a fiddler soon became so well recognized that Austrian music journalist Richard Schuberth counted her among the "crème de la crème of the English folk-rock scene". She brought with her a background of US genres of folk music which blended well with the British folk-rock scene. In one case at least, her influence on the British music scene rebounded to have an effect on the US music scene: American guitarist and author of several instructional manuals Duck Baker wrote that he had learned the Peacock Rag from John Renbourn "who would have gotten it from Sue Draheim". Draheim had begun her association with John Renbourn in 1971, and joined the John Renbourn Group, cutting the album Faro Annie with John Renbourn, Keshav Sathe, and Jacqui McShee in 1972. Impressed by Draheim's old West Clare style which she'd learned from Joe Cooley, John Renbourn observed: "I found out more about Irish music from Sue than I could ever have imagined." That same year she also performed on Henry the Human Fly, an album by songwriter and guitarist Richard Thompson. 1972 was a busy year for her as she and John Renbourn worked together with Wizz Jones to produce Wizz's album Right Now, in addition to recording albums with Scottish folksinger Marc Ellington.

In 1972, Draheim debuted live with the then unknown Albion Country Band. The band (sometimes known as Albion Mk 1, and described by Spanish film and music critic Antonio Méndez as being "traditional British folk with an electric infusion"), appeared on John Peel's BBC Radio 1 program called "Peel Sessions" which introduced up-and-coming musicians. In June 1972 Draheim and the Albion Country Band also recorded and had broadcast a piece (Four Hand Reel/St. Anne's Reel) for the BBC radio show called Top Gear, which also featured contemporary musicians; the recording was later released in 1994 on Ashley Hutchings's compilation The Guv'nor vol 1. Two tracks on The Guv'nor vol 2 released in 1995 are from that same 1972 broadcast. Also in Albion at this time was Steve Ashley, who later referred to Draheim as "the great American fiddle player". (For a photo of Draheim with the Albion Country Band, see The Peel Sessions: The Albion Band).

Not confining herself to the folk rock genre, she recorded the album Solid Air in 1973 with John Martyn, who has been described as blurring "...the boundaries between folk, jazz, rock and blues". When Draheim worked briefly in 1973–1974 with Albion's incarnation as the Albion Country Band which included Steve Ashley, they backed up Ashley on his first album Stroll On, which Folk Review named "Contemporary Folk Album of the Year" in 1974. Just before leaving the UK to return to the US in 1977, Draheim recorded again with John Renbourn to produce the album A Maid in Bedlam.

== Late 1970s through the 1980s in the US ==
In late 1977 she returned to Oakland where she joined the all-women group Any Old Time String Band and recorded two albums with them, Any Old Time String Band and Ladies Choice. Both albums were re-released in 1996 by Arhoolie on a single CD titled "I Bid You Goodnight".

One of Draheim's hallmarks was her eclecticism, and the first half of the 80s found her recording with a variety of artists including ethereal, new wave pagan/wiccan Gwydion Pendderwen, the more solidly traditional Cajun and country Delta Sisters, and Rory McNamara with his blend of Irish and American music.

== 1990s ==
Draheim, Jody Stecher (from the Colby Street days), and Kate Brislin (who was with Draheim in the Any Old Time String Band) joined Kathy Kallick and others in 1995 on Kallick's album Use a Napkin (Not Your Mom), a recording which featured Appalachian style songs composed by Kallick, and was especially aimed at children (a group of whom sang along with the musicians).

In 1998 Draheim collaborated with John Cohen, David Grisman, and Jody Stecher on tracks included in Stories the Crow Told Me, Cohen's only album released without the New Lost City Ramblers.

Additionally, during the 1990s nearly a dozen retrospective compilation albums (including three by John Renbourn) were released which featured earlier recordings with Draheim, some of them going as far back as the 1970s (see discography).

== 2000s ==
In 1999, Draheim joined Golden Bough, a Northern California group which focuses on traditional Celtic folk music. After producing two albums with them which were released in 2000 and 2002, she left the group just two years later in 2001, but still got together to play with them from time to time. Joining Craicmore, a group which describes itself as "a contemporary traditional Celtic band", Draheim released an album with them in 2002.

Teaming up with mandolinist Lief Sorbye, Draheim completed the other half of the duo known as "Caliban" which led to her joining the Oakland-based Celtic rock band Tempest which Lief had founded; she recorded two albums with them on Magna Carta Records (Shapeshifter and the 15th Anniversary Collection). Appraisal of Draheim's work with Tempest included such comments as: "The addition of Sue Draheim (Jon Renbourn Group and Sorbye's other unit, Caliban) has added an extra, deeper and (again) more relaxed dimension to the Tempest sound. Her ultra-fluid fiddle lines and soft harmony vocals lend balance...", "The harmony vocals, courtesy of newcomer Sue Draheim (who also plays fiddle and viola) are more prominent than ever...", "Sue Draheim's fiddle weaves exuberantly wild or exquisitely controlled ...", "Sue Draheim's fiddle has a very warm and rich sound ... that just highlights her beautiful playing. Sue really gets to the heart of the song with her playing and makes the melodies come alive, without overpowering the band" and "Sue Draheim is a revelation on fiddle, bringing years of playing with her, adding texture and tone." One journalist, reviewing a Tempest album released after Draheim had left the group, lamented: "...I miss the blazing elegance of fiddler Sue Draheim...".

Draheim and others were founders of a group known as "Stuart Rosh and the Geniuses", releasing the album Accept No Imitations in 2004. The group was led by Stuart Rojstaczer scientist, writer, and musician performing under the name of "Stuart Rosh". Referring to her "flowing fiddle lines and backup vocals", Rojstaczer wrote that "Sue's lessons will set you on the path to musical bliss".

Later in 2004 she worked with the young singer Michael Bannett to produce an album featuring a collection of British Isles songs from the 17th to the early 20th centuries. Draheim got together with Golden Bough again in 2006 for a 25th anniversary reunion concert, which resulted in an album release of traditional British folk music. Moving into a different genre altogether, Draheim joined "Hiss Golden Messenger", which has been described as "alternative country" and "country rock", to produce an album in 2009. An Arhoolie Records retrospective was released in 2013, including some of Draheim's earlier recordings with them, but Draheim's last new release was in 2011, a live recording with Southern country blues singer and guitarist Wayde Blair at Berkeley's Art House.

In her later years Draheim settled in Berea, Kentucky, with her partner Wayde Blair, whom she had known and performed with in Berkeley, and quickly got involved in the music scene there, performing at Berea's Center for the Arts as well as with a small contra dance group known as "Sea Change" at Berea's Main Street Café.

When she was diagnosed with cancer in March 2013, Berkeley's Freight & Salvage (long a Bay Area center of folk music and a favorite of Draheim's, having performed there many times over the years from the beginnings of her career with Dr. Humbead's New Tranquility String Band and Medicine Show and as recently as 2010) held a special concert to show support for and honor her on April 1, 2013. Among those performing in recognition of her contributions to music were musicians Eric & Suzy Thompson, Jody Stecher & Kate Brislin, and Will Spires (who had played with Draheim in the early years of her career), Tempest, Golden Bough, and Kathy Kallick, (who had played with Draheim when her career had been firmly established), as well as Laurie Lewis & Tom Rozum, Tony Marcus & Patrice Haan, Paul Hale String Quartet, Live Oak Ceili Band with the Patricia Kennelly Irish Step Dancers, Don Burnham & the Bolos, Johnny Harper, Delilah Lewis & Karen Leigh, Harry & Cindy Liedstrand, and Gerry Tenney & the Hard Times Orchestra.

Sue Draheim died on April 11, 2013, in Berea, Kentucky, at the age of 63.

== Discography ==
- 1970 Blue Ridge Mountain Field Trip, (one track with Mac Benford & Buddy Pendleton), Leader LEA 4012 LP
- 1972 Berkeley Farms, (two tracks with Dr. Humbead's New Tranquility String Band), Folkways FA2436 LP
- 1972 Faro Annie, John Renbourn, Transatlantic MS2082 LP
- 1972 Henry The Human Fly, Richard Thompson, Carthage CGLP405 LP
- 1972 Right Now, Wizz Jones, CBS 64809 LP; Columbia 493337 CD
- 1972 Restoration, Marc Ellington, Philips 6308143 LP
- 1973 Solid Air, John Martyn, Island ILPS 9226 LP; reissued 2009 Universal Island Records IMCD 274/548147-2
- 1974 Stroll On, Steve Ashley, (one track recorded in November 1972 with The Albion Country Band), Gull GU1003 LP (UK); Gull GU6-401S1 LP (US, 1975)
- 1977 A Maid In Bedlam, John Renbourn Group, Transatlantic 0064.007 LP (1977); Shanachie 79004 LP (1987); Castle Music CMRCD991 CD (2004)
- 1978 Any Old Time String Band, Arhoolie 4009 LP
- 1980 Ladies Choice, Any Old Time, Bay 217 LP
- 1981 The Faerie Shaman, Gwydion (aka Gwydion Pendderwen), Nemeton NEM102 LP
- 1981 Music From The Old Timey Hotel, The Delta Sisters, Rooster 111 LP; Ubik UB24 CD
- 1984 Still Got That Look In His Eye, Rory McNamara, Kicking Mule KM323 LP
- 1993 Watching The Dark, Richard Thompson, Hannibal 5303 CD
- 1994 The Young Fogies, with Dr. Humbead's New Tranquility String Band, Rounder Select 319 CD (original 1985 Heritage Records 056 LP)
- 1994 The Guv'nor Vol. 1, (playing with Albion), HTD Records HTDCD23 CD; Castle Music America CMACD519 CD; Transatlantic Records TRACD323 CD
- 1995 Use A Napkin (Not Your Mom), Kathy Kallick, Sugar Hill Records 3833 CD
- 1995 Sweet Little Mysteries: The Island Anthology, John Martyn, PolyGram Records 522245 CD
- 1995 The Guv'nor Vol. 2, (playing with Albion), HTD Records HTDCD29 CD; Castle Music America CMACD546 CD (1996)
- 1996 John Barleycorn, John Renbourn, Edsel Records EDCD472 CD
- 1996 I Bid You Goodnight, Any Old Time String Band, Arhoolie 433 CD
- 1996 Lost Sessions, John Renbourn, Edsel Records UK ED490 CD
- 1997 So Clear, John Renbourn, Recall SMD CD 152 CD
- 1998 Stories The Crow Told Me, John Cohen, Acoustic Disc 34 CD
- 1999 Stroll On Revisited, Steve Ashley, Market Square 104 CD
- 1999 Sam Chatmon 1970-1974, Sam Chatmon, Flyright Records FLY CD 63 CD
- 2000 Acoustic Disc 100% Handmade Music Vol. 5, with Jody Stecher & John Cohen, Acoustic Disc 40 CD
- 2000 The Best Of Richard And Linda Thompson: The Island Record Years, Richard Thompson, Island IMCD 270/542456-2
- 2000 Winters Dance, Golden Bough, Arc Music EUCD 1046 CD
- 2002 Songs Of Scotland, Golden Bough, Arc Music GB221 CD
- 2002 Too Bad For Heaven, Too Good For Hell, Craicmore, Kilts On Productions KOPC002 CD
- 2003 Shapeshifter, Tempest, Magna Carta MA-9066-2 CD
- 2004 Accept No Imitations, Stuart Rosh and The Geniuses, Winged Flight 1001 CD
- 2004 15th Anniversary Collection, Tempest, Magna Carta MA-1503-0 CD
- 2004 Journey Through The British Isles, Michael Bannett, Crescendo Music Productions 5637216606 CD
- 2006 Golden Bough Live: 25th Anniversary Reunion Concert, Golden Bough, Arc Music EUCD 2008 CD
- 2007 Lief's Birthday Bash, Tempest, Golden Bough, Caliban, Magna Carta MA-9093-2 CD
- 2008 Prime Cuts, Tempest, Magna Carta MA-1014-2 CD / DVD
- 2008 Berkeley In The 1960s, Dr. Humbead's New Tranquility String Band, Field Recorders Collective FRC609 CD(recorded 1970)
- 2009 50 Years: Where Do You Come From, Where Do You Go?, The New Lost City Ramblers, Smithsonian Folkways Recordings SFW40180 CD
- 2009 Country Hai East Cotton, Hiss Golden Messenger, Heaven & Earth Magic Recording Co
- 2009 So Far So Good, Rory McNamara, CD Baby 356607 CD
- 2009 Walking On A Wire 1968-2009, Richard Thompson, Shout! Factory 826663-11087 CD
- 2009 Meet On The Ledge: An Island Records Folk-Rock Anthology, John Martyn, Island 531 834-1 CD
- 2009 Old Time Music Collection, Volume 1, (with John Cohen & Jody Stecher), Acoustic Disc ACD-AO-50011 CD
- 2011 Live At The Art House, Wayde Blair, CD Baby 195982
- 2013 They Played For Us: Arhoolie Records 50th Anniversary Celebration, Arhoolie 540 CD
