= The Complete Guitarist =

Compilation album by Davey Graham
- Released: 1978
- Genre: Folk, blues, jazz
- Length: 51:44
- Label: Kicking Mule
- Producer: Stefan Grossman, John Renbourn

Davey Graham chronology
| All That Moody (1976) | The Complete Guitarist (1978) | Dance for Two People (1979) |

The Complete Guitarist is a compilation album by British musician Davey Graham, released in 1978. It was reissued on CD in 1999 with eight bonus tracks from 1979-1980 added.

== Reception ==
Professional ratings
Review scores
| Source | Rating |
|---|---|
| Allmusic | 4/5 stars |

In his Allmusic review, critic Alex Henderson wrote "To those who are unfamiliar with Davey Graham's work, The Complete Guitarist might seem like a lofty title for this album. But it's a title that the Scottish musician, who has commanded a lot of respect in U.K. folk circles since emerging in the 1960s, lives up to on these unaccompanied acoustic solo-guitar recordings from the late 1970s... Whether it's Celtic music, classical, blues, or jazz, Graham has no problem tackling a variety of styles and demonstrating that he really is the complete guitarist."

== Track listing ==
All songs by Davey Graham unless otherwise noted.

1. "Lord Mayo/Lord Inchiquin" (Traditional) – 4:30
2. "Lashtal's Room" (Davey Graham) – 1:59
3. "Ein feste Burg – 1:29
4. "The Rod to Lisdoonvana" (Traditional) – 1:58
5. "Renaissance Piece" (Traditional) – 1:50
6. "Hardman the Fiddler" (Traditional) – 1:39
7. "Sarah" – 3:55
8. "Frieze Britches" (Traditional) – 3:00
9. "Blues for Gino" (Davy Graham) – 2:56
10. "The Hunter's Purse" (Traditional) – 1:25
11. "Prelude from the Suite in D Minor" (Robert de Visée) – 1:02
12. "Fairies' Hornpipe" (Traditional) – 1:30
13. "Forty Ton Parachute" (Davy Graham) – 1:28
14. "The Gold Ring" (Traditional) – 2:20
15. "Down Ampney" (Vaughan Williams) – 0:49
16. "Banish Misfortune" (Traditional) – 1:52
  1999 reissue bonus tracks:
17. "Dance for Two People" (Stanley Albert Watson) – 2:12
18. "Bloody Fields of Flanders" (Alex Stuart) – 1:36
19. "Happy Meeting in Glory" (Traditional) – 2:00
20. "Farewell to the Creeks" (James Robertson) – 1:27
21. "Mná na hÉireann (Women of Ireland)" (Traditional) – 3:29
22. "Panic Room Blue" (Robertson) – 2:39
23. "How Come You Do Me Like You Do?" (Willie Dixon, Memphis Slim) – 2:39
24. "When I Been Drinking" (Big Bill Broonzy)– 2:00

== Personnel ==
- Davey Graham – vocals, guitar

Production notes:

- Stefan Grossman – producer
- John Renbourn – producer
- Nic Kinsey – engineer
- Joe Tarantino – remastering
- Deb Sibony – design
- Jamie Putnam – art direction
- Duck Baker – liner notes
