= Not in Our Name CD =

2015 album protesting the war in Iraq

- CD Cover by Allison Carmichael

Studio album by Stephanie de Sykes, Earl Okin, Alisha Sufit, Debi Doss, Tim Hain, Tormey Woods et al
- Released: 2015
- Recorded: October, 2015 London and Manchester
- Genre: Jazz, Poetry and Peace
- Length: 60:00
- Label: Impeach Tony Blair
- Producer: Caroline Kennedy, Janis Hetherington, Stephanie de Sykes

Not in Our Name CD is a pro-peace album in support of the victims of the Iraq War featuring jazz, folk and classical music, songs and poetry. It arose from the Facebook group "Impeach Tony Blair" and was recorded in October 2015 in London and Manchester.

The CD includes a eulogy by Craig Brierley whose brother was killed in Iraq in 2003. Their father, Peter Brierley, confronted Tony Blair, refusing to shake his hand, and is a staunch anti-war campaigner and seeker of answers to the "weapons of mass destruction" question. He was one of the driving influences in creating the CD.

Peter Brierley was interviewed about the CD on Good Morning on ITV on 30 October 2015.

== Personnel ==
- Alisha Sufit – singer, songwriter, poet
- Stephanie de Sykes – singer, songwriter
- Earl Okin – singer, songwriter, musician, arranger, comedian
- Debi Doss – singer
- Annie Skates – singer
- Mary Carewe – singer
- Ray Souter – writer
- Tom Laimer-Read – writer
- Tim Hain – singer, songwriter
- Tormey Woods – singer
- David Erdos – actor and director
- Cary Elwes – actor
- Julie Hesmondhalgh – actress
- Maxine Peake – actress
- Michael Smiley – actor
- Heathcote Williams – poet and actor
- Caroline Kennedy – writer
- Janis Hetherington – writer
- Allison Carmichael – CD cover designer
- Cliff Jones – producer

== Track listing ==
Listings are in the format: Track – singer or performer (writer)

1. "Bomb Babies" – Annie Skates (Stephanie De-Sykes)
2. "Blair’s Jerusalem" – Choir (Caroline Kennedy)
3. "Bombs Over Basra" – Julie Hesmondhalgh (Tom Laimer-Read)
4. "Bomb Babies Reprise" – Annie Skates (Stephanie De-Sykes)
5. "The Great John Chilcot" – Cary Elwes (Caroline Kennedy)
6. "We Three Things" – Choir (Ray Souter)
7. "BLIAR" – David Erdos (Alisha Sufit)
8. "Bomb Babies Reprise" – Annie Skates (Stephanie De-Sykes)
9. "The Right Thing To Do" – Michael Smiley (John William Brown)
10. "Silent Night Reprise" – Choir (Caroline Kennedy)
11. "Tony Blair – Tory Lite" – Earl Okin (Earl Okin & Independent Music Group)
12. "Ode To Dick Cheney" – Cary Elwes (Caroline Kennedy)
13. "Mr Blair" – Alisha Sufit (Alisha Sufit)
14. "Silent Night Reprise" – Choir
15. "Blair Of Wars And Glory" – David Erdos + Choir (Caroline Kennedy)
16. "The Mock Inquisitor" – Julie Hesmondhalgh (Ray Souter)
17. "If I Ever Get Home" – Tim Hain (Tim Hain)
18. "Eulogy To My Brother" – Craig Brierley (Craig Brierley)
19. "Who Did This To Me?" – Maxine Peake (Heathcote Williams)
20. "Somewhere In Baghdad" – Annie Skates (Caroline Kennedy)
21. "Dying Child" – Stephanie De-Sykes (Janis Hetherington)
22. "Silent Night Reprise" – Choir (Caroline Kennedy)
