= Mala Punica =

Music ensemble

Mala Punica is an early music ensemble led by Pedro Memelsdorff.

== Discography ==
- Ars Subtilis Ytalica, Arcana, 1994.
- D'Amor ragionando, Ballades du neo-Stilnovo en Italie, 1380-1415, Arcana, 1995.
- En attendant. L'art de la citation dans l'Italie des Visconti, 1380-1410, Arcana, 1996.
- Missa cantilena, Contrafactures liturgiques en Italie, 1380-1410, Erato, 1997
- Sidus Preclarum, The complete motets of Johannes Ciconia, 1370-1412, Erato, 1998
- Hélas Avril. Les chansons de Matteo da Perugia, Erato, 1999
- Narcisso Speculando. I madrigali di Don Paolo da Firenze, Harmonia Mundi, 2002
- Faventina. The liturgical music of Codex Faenza, Naïve, 2007
