= Modena Codex =

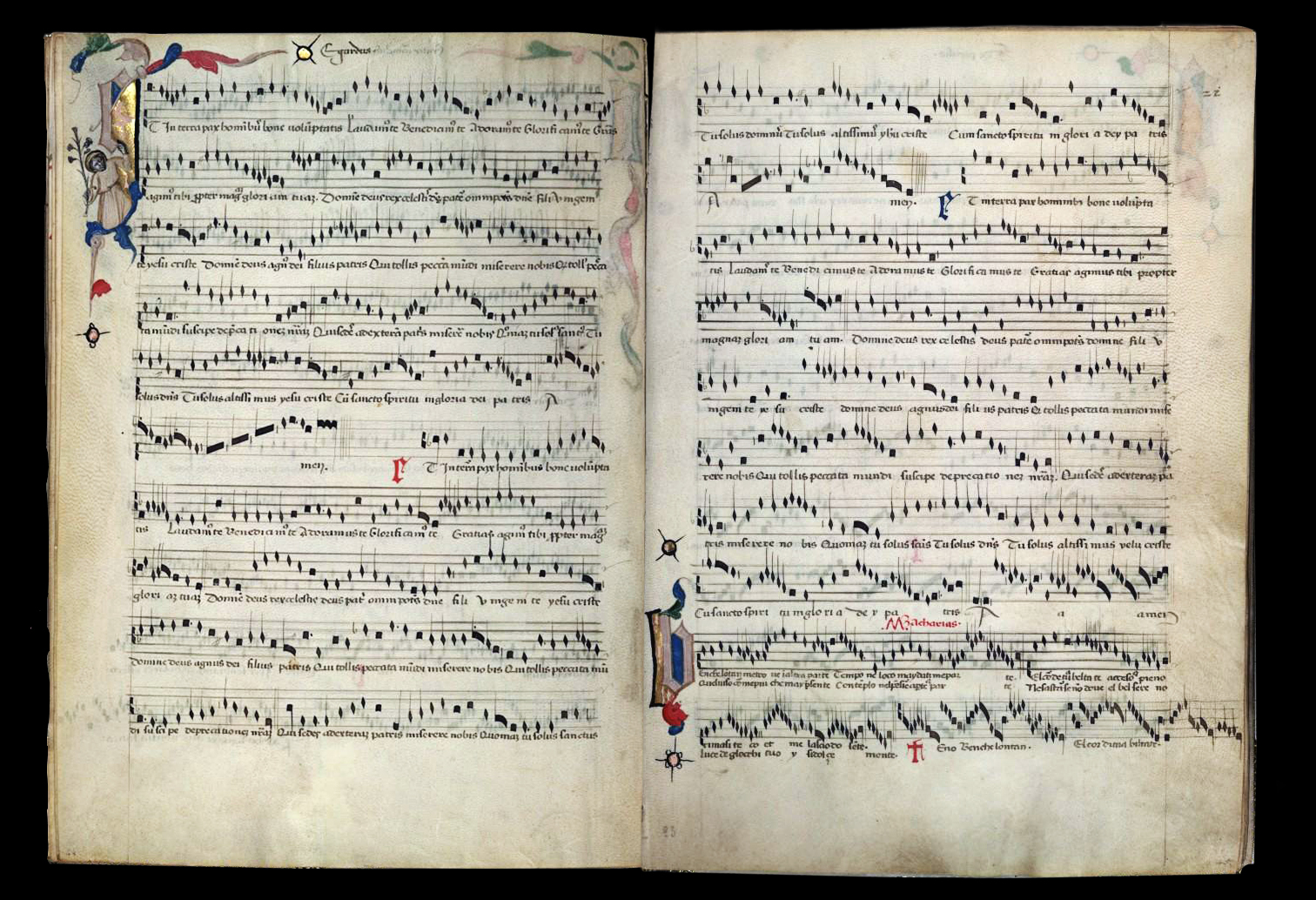
Excerpt from the 14th-15th-century Modena Codex containing Et in terra pax hominibus bonae by Matteo da Perugia

The Modena Codex (Modena, Biblioteca Estense, α.m.5,24; often referred to with the siglum Mod A) is an early fifteenth-century Italian manuscript of medieval music. The manuscript is one of the most important sources of the ars subtilior style of music. It is held in the Biblioteca Estense library in Modena.

The precise origin of Mod A is controversial, with Pavia/Milan, Pisa and Bologna all being proposed. Firm evidence of ownership of the book by the Biblioteca Estense only occurs in the early nineteenth century, although a 1495 catalogue of the Este family library in Ferrara might refer to it. It was rediscovered by the philologist Antonio Cappelli in 1868.

Excluding flyleaves and modern additions, Mod A comprises 51 parchment folios divided into five gatherings. The first and last gatherings are decorated in a simpler style from the central gatherings and mostly contain the works of Matteo da Perugia, while the middle three gatherings contain works by a more varied group of composers in the ars subtilior and Italian Trecento traditions.

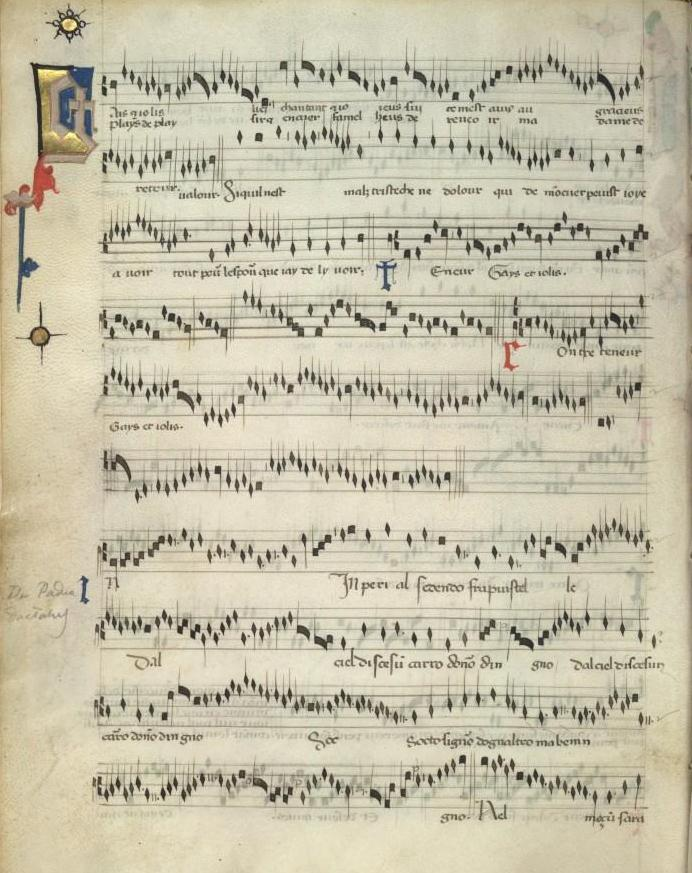
Gais et jolis by Guillaume de Machaut in the Modena Codex

The manuscript contains 100 pieces, mostly by French and Italian composers, all of which are polyphonic. While the codex contains some religious works, including 12 Mass movements, most of the texts and forms are secular, including forms such as ballades, rondeaus, virelais, and ballatas. Most of the compositions display the intricate and complex rhythms that define ars subtilior. Despite its presumably Italian origins, many of the pieces set French texts. Most of the compositions in the Modena Codex date from ca. 1380–1420. Many of the works by Matteo da Perugia were added later.

Mod A is the most important source of the compositions of Matteo da Perugia, containing thirty attributed full works and two single parts by him. The Modena Codex also contains multiple works from the composers Antonello da Caserta, Antonio Zachara da Teramo, Philippus de Caserta, Jaquemin de Senleches, Guillaume de Machaut, Bartolino da Padova, Bartolomeo da Bologna, Johannes Ciconia, Conradus de Pistoria, Egardus, Egidius, Johannes de Janua, Matheus de Sancto Johanne, and Andreas Servorum.

== Bibliography ==
- Apel, Willi, ed., French Secular Compositions of the Fourteenth Century. American Institute of Musicology, 1970.
- Cappelli, Antonio, Poesie musicali dei secoli XIV, XV e XVI tratte da vari codici (Bologna: Romagnoli, 1868), online via Google Books at
- Günther, Ursula (ed.). The Motets of the Manuscripts Chantilly, Musée condé, 564 (olim 1047) and Modena, Biblioteca Estense, a. M. 5, 24 (olim lat. 568). Corpus mensurabilis musicae 39. [n.p.]: American Institute of Musicology, 1965.
- Günther, Ursula. "Unusual Phenomena in the Transmission of Late Fourteenth-Century Polyphonic Music". Musica disciplina 38 (1984).
- Günther, Ursula. "Sources, MS, VII: French Polyphony 1300–1420" in Grove Music Online (accessed July 15, 2012), (subscription access).
- Günther, Ursula and Anne Stone. "Matteo da Perugia" in Grove Music Online (accessed July 27, 2012), (subscription access).
- Haring, Jos and Kees Boeke, editors. Modena Codex: New, Complete Edition with Commentary (Amsterdam: Olive Music, 2019). ISBN 978-9-083-01800-3
- Hoppin, Richard H. Medieval Music. The Norton Introduction to Music History. New York, W.W. Norton & Co., 1978. ISBN 0-393-09090-6
- Pirrotta, Nino. "Il codice Estense lat. 568 e la musica francese in Italia al principio del '400." Atti della Reale Accademia di Scienze, Lettere e Arti de Palermo IV (1944/45): 101–54.
- Plumley, Yolanda. "An 'Episode in the South'? Ars Subtilior and the Patronage of French Princes." Early Music History: Studies in Medieval and Early Modern Music 22 (2003): 103–68.
- Stoessel, Jason. "Arms, a Saint and Inperial sedendo fra più stelle: The Illuminator of Mod A." Journal of Musicology 31 (2014): 1–42.
- Stone, Anne. The Manuscript Modena, Biblioteca Estense, Alpha.M.5.24: Critical Study and Facsimile Edition. Libreria Italiana Musicale, 2005.
