= Zun-Murino =

Zun-Murino Зун-Мурино
- Settlement
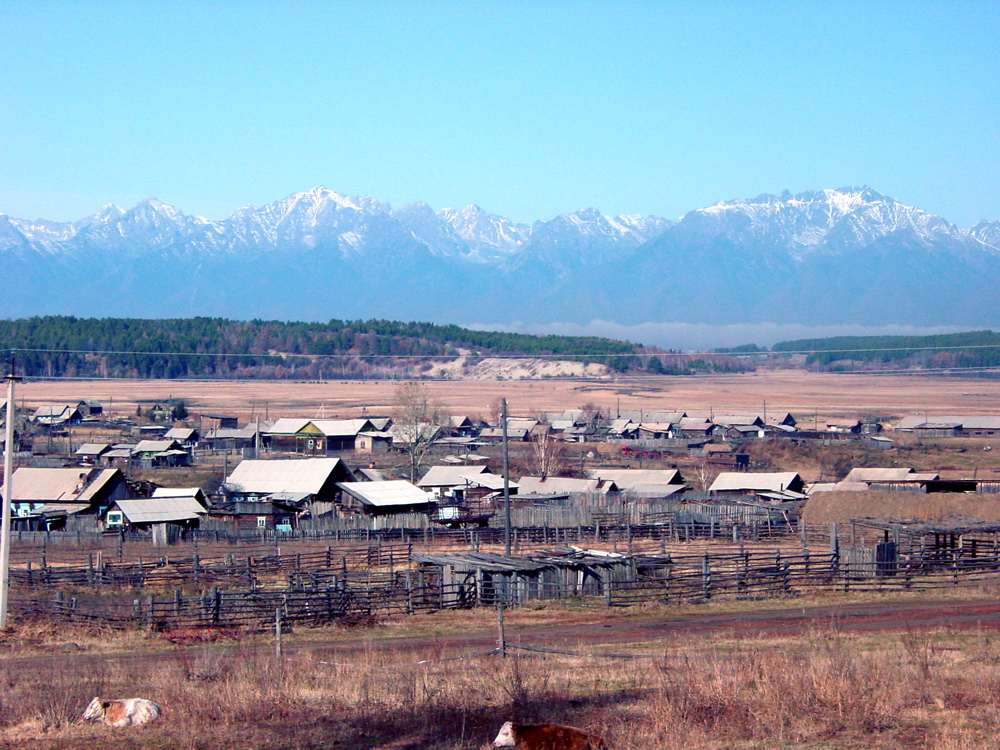
- View of the settlement

- Location within Republic of Buryatia Location within Russia
- Coordinates: 51°44′N 102°52′E
- Country: Russia
- Region: Republic of Buryatia
- District: Tunkinsky District
- Time zone: UTC+8:00

Zun-Murino (Russian: Зун-Мурино; Buryat: Зγγн Мγрэн, Züün Müren) is a rural locality (a settlement) in Tunkinsky District, Republic of Buryatia, Russia. The population was 979 as of 2010. There are 20 streets.

== Geography ==
Zun-Murino is located 56 km east of Kyren (the district's administrative centre) by road. Shanay is the nearest rural locality.
