= Keshav Sathe =

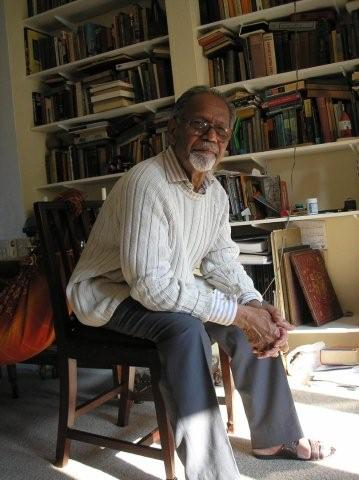

Background information
- Born: Keshav Sathe; 31 January 1928
- Origin: Bombay, India
- Died: 18 January 2012 (aged 83)
- Genres: Indo jazz
- Occupations: tabla player and teacher
- Instrument: tabla
- Labels: Atlantic Records

Keshav Sathe (31 January 1928 – 18 January 2012) was an Indian tabla player, best known for his contributions to the Indo-jazz fusion genre. Among his significant collaborations are the ones with Joe Harriott and John Mayer in 1965–70; Irene Schweizer trio, Barney Wilen and Manfred Schoof in 1967; and later work with John Martyn, John Renbourn, Danny Thompson and Julie Felix.

== Life ==
Keshav Sathe was born in Bombay, where he began his professional career in 1951, working with a local Indian vocalist by the name of Kelkar. He moved to the United Kingdom in 1956 and joined the Asian Music Circle, a pool of London-based Indian musicians run by former political activist Ayana Deva Angadi. Sathe worked with visiting Indian sitarist Bhaskar Chandavarkar, and in 1961 they played together with the harmonica virtuoso Larry Adler. This was Sathe’s first contact with jazz.

In 1965 Sathe began his Indo Jazz Fusion performances and recordings with John Mayer and Joe Harriott, a musical relationship that lasted until 1970. In 1967 he was invited with his trio (with Diwan Motihar, sitar, and Kasan Thakur, tamboura) to join the trio of jazz pianist Irène Schweizer (together with Barney Willen, Mani Neumeier, Uli Trepte and Manfred Schoof). They appeared at the Donaueschingen Festival and Berlin Jazz Tage. The album "Jazz Meets India" was recorded in Villingen (Black Forest).

From 1970–73 he worked and toured with Julie Felix and Danny Thompson. Through Danny, in 1974, he joined the John Renbourn Group with John Renbourn, Jacqui McShee, Tony Roberts, Sue Draheim and later John Molineux, touring UK, Europe and US, and producing records, including "A Maid in Bedlam", "Enchanted Garden" and "Live in America".

In the 1980s, Sathe formed a group with Tony Roberts which included the dancer Shobana Jeyasingh, and toured UK and Northern Ireland. With the singer Alisha Sufit and group, he made the record "Magic Carpet". From 1965 to 1993 he regularly accompanied the late singer/dancer Surya Kumari in recitals and teaching workshops. He appears on reggae dub fusion band Suns of Arqa's live album Musical Revue which was recorded in Manchester in 1982.

Apart from these, Keshav has made numerous incidental recordings, worked for television, radio, and taught tabla until 2003.

== Select Discography ==
With Joe Harriott and John Mayer

- Indo Jazz Fusions (Atlantic Records)

With Irene Schweizer

- Jazz Meets India (Polydor Records)
