= Anji (instrumental) =

1961 Acoustic folk song

"Angi"

Song by Davy Graham

from the album 3/4 AD
- Released: 1962
- Genre: Folk
- Length: 2:27
- Label: Topic
- Songwriter(s): Davy Graham

"Angie"

Song by Bert Jansch

from the album Bert Jansch
- Released: April 16, 1965
- Genre: Folk
- Length: 3:15
- Label: Transatlantic
- Songwriter(s): Davy Graham
- Producer(s): Bill Leader

"Anji"

Song by Simon & Garfunkel

from the album Sounds of Silence
- Released: January 17, 1966
- Recorded: December 13, 1965
- Genre: Folk
- Length: 2:17
- Label: Columbia
- Songwriter(s): Davy Graham
- Producer(s): Bob Johnston

"Anji" (also spelled "Angi", "Angie" or "On gee") is an acoustic fingerstyle guitar piece composed and recorded by noted folk guitarist Davy Graham in 1961 and originally released as part of his EP debut 3/4 AD. The piece is one of the best-known acoustic blues-folk guitar pieces ever composed, with many notable artists covering it, such as Bert Jansch (included on his first album, Bert Jansch, in 1965, renamed as "Angie" – the album cover credits Graham), John Renbourn, Lillebjørn Nilsen, Paul Simon (on the Simon & Garfunkel album Sounds of Silence), and Harry Sacksioni (on his Optima Forma - Live album). The tune is in the key of A minor (often used with a capo at the second fret) and is notable for its trademark descending bassline. However, the original recording by Davy Graham is in the key of C minor with a capo at the third fret.

Parts of the tune were sampled for the Chumbawamba track "Jacob's Ladder" from their album Readymades and the anti-war single "Jacob's Ladder (Not In My Name)". Paul Simon, in his version, quotes a song from Sounds of Silence, "We've Got a Groovy Thing Goin'," and, further, another song from the same album, "Somewhere They Can't Find Me," opens with the guitar riff from "Anji".
