= Bert Jansch discography =

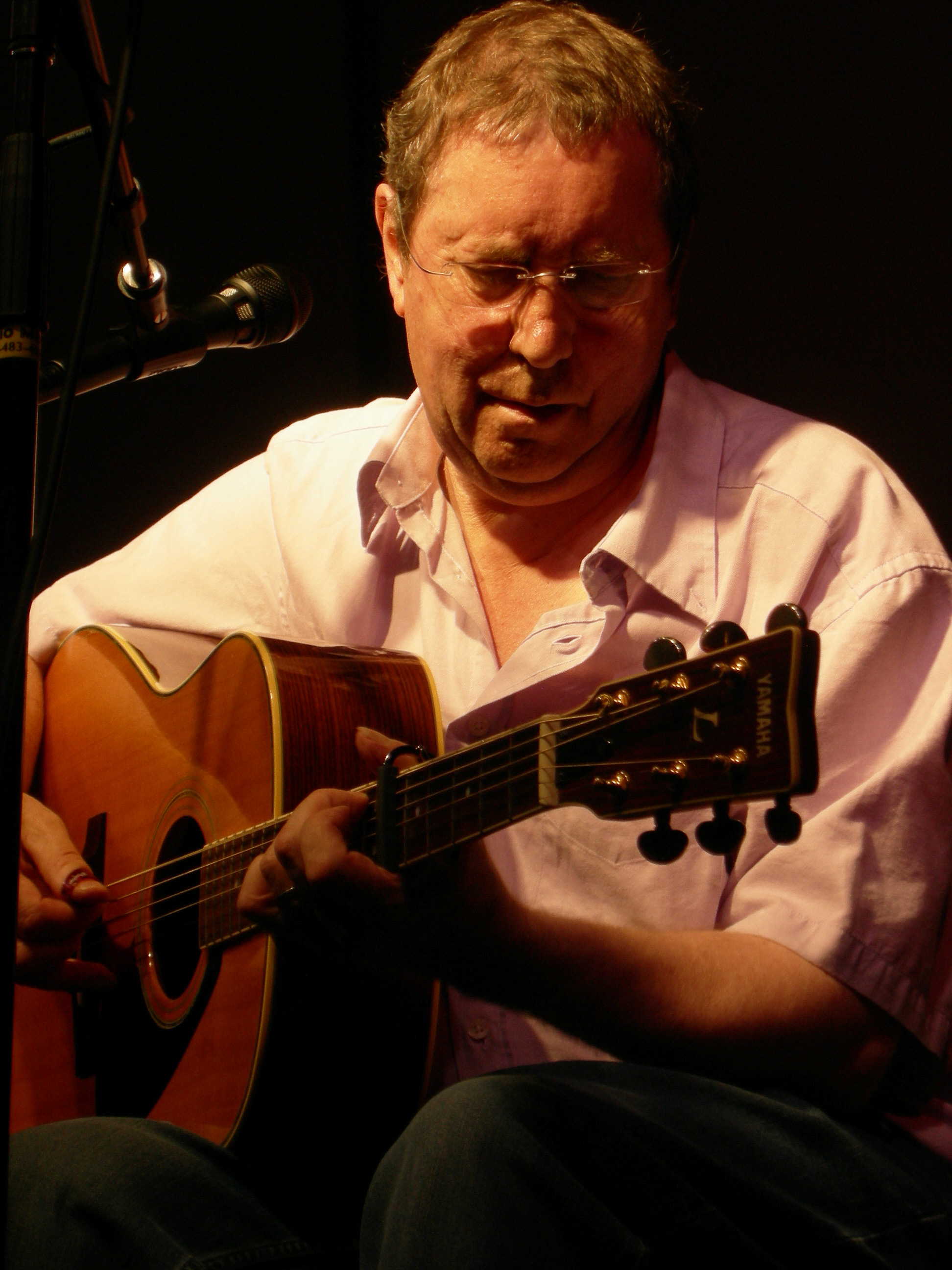
- Bert Jansch performs at Bumbershoot in Seattle, Washington, USA
- Studio albums: 23
- EPs: 2
- Live albums: 8
- Compilation albums: 36
- Tribute albums: 1
- Singles: 12
- Video albums: 5

Bert Jansch was a Scottish folk musician. His discography consists of 23 studio albums, 8 live albums, 36 compilations, 5 videos, 2 EPs, and 12 singles. In addition, his compositions and guitar work have been featured on a number of albums by other artists.

== Albums ==
- 1965: Bert Jansch (Transatlantic)
- 1965: It Don't Bother Me (Transatlantic)
- 1966: Jack Orion (Transatlantic)
- 1966: Bert and John (Transatlantic)
- 1967: Nicola (Transatlantic)
- 1969: Birthday Blues (Transatlantic)
- 1971: Rosemary Lane (Transatlantic)
- 1973: Moonshine (Reprise)
- 1974: L.A. Turnaround (Charisma)
- 1975: Santa Barbara Honeymoon (Charisma)
- 1977: A Rare Conundrum (Charisma) first released 1976 in Denmark on Ex Libris as Poor Mouth with additional tracks "Dragonfly", "Candy Man", "Three Dreamers", and "Per's Hose Pipe"
- 1978: Avocet (released on Ex Libris in Denmark and in 1979 on Charisma in UK)
- 1980: Thirteen Down (credited as The Bert Jansch Conundrum)
- 1982: Heartbreak (Columbia)
- 1985: From the Outside (Konexion) only released officially in Belgium
- 1989: Leather Launderette (Black Crow)
- 1990: Sketches (Temple)
- 1990: The Ornament Tree (Gold Castle)
- 1995: When the Circus Comes to Town (Cooking Vinyl)
- 1998: Toy Balloon (Cooking Vinyl)
- 2000: Crimson Moon (When! Recordings)
- 2002: Edge of a Dream (Sanctuary)
- 2006: The Black Swan (Sanctuary)

== Live albums ==
- 1980: Bert Jansch Live at La Foret (Columbia) with Martin Jenkins, released in Japan only
- 1993: BBC Radio 1 Live in Concert (BBC Transcription Services)
- 1996: Live at the 12 Bar: An Authorised Bootleg (Jansch Records)
- 1998: Young Man Blues - Live in Glasgow 1962 - 1964 (Big Beat)
- 2001: Downunder: Live in Australia (Castle)
- 2004: The River Sessions (River)
- 2007: Fresh as a Sweet Sunday Morning CD, DVD (Mooncrest), live 22 April 2006 Sheffield Memorial Hall
- 2012: Sweet Sweet Music (Secret)
- 2020: Strolling Down the Highway (Secret), reissue on CD

== Compilations ==
- 1966: Lucky Thirteen (Vanguard) U.S. release containing tracks from Jansch's first two UK albums
- 1969: Bert Jansch: The Bert Jansch Sampler (Transatlantic)
- 1972: Box of Love: The Bert Jansch Sampler Volume 2 (Transatlantic)
- 1976: Early Bert Volume 1+2 (Transatlantic)
- 1977: The Guitar of Bert Jansch (Transatlantic)
- 1978: Anthology (Transatlantic)
- 1978: Anthology Volume 1 (Transatlantic)
- 1978: Anthology Volume 2 (Transatlantic)
- 1979: The Best Of (Kicking Mule)
- 1979: Bert Jansch / Rosemary Lane (Transatlantic) released in Spain
- 1982: Renbourn & Jansch (Cambra) with John Renbourn
- 1982: How to Play Folk Guitar with Bert Jansch and John Renbourn (Transatlantic)
- 1986: Volume One Strolling Down the Highway (Transatlantic)
- 1992: After the Dance (Shanachie) with John Renbourn
- 1992: The Gardener: Essential Bert Jansch 1965-71 (Transatlantic/Demon)
- 1992: Bert Jansch + Jack Orion (Transatlantic/Demon)
- 1993: Nicola Plus Birthday Blues (Demon)
- 1993: Three Chord Trick (Virgin)
- 1995: Bert Jansch - The Collection (Castle)
- 1996: After the Long Night / Playing the Game (Christabel) with Loren Auerbach
- 1996: Bert Jansch + It Don't Bother Me (Essential/Castle)
- 1997: Birthday Blues + Rosemary Lane (Essential/Transatlantic)
- 1997: Jack Orion + Nicola (Essential/Castle)
- 1997: Blackwater Side (Recall)
- 2000: Dazzling Stranger: The Bert Jansch Anthology (Castle)
- 2001: An Introduction to... Bert Jansch (Castle Pie)
- 2003: Legend: The Classic Recordings (Union Square)
- 2005: Running from Home: An Introduction to Bert Jansch (Sanctuary)
- 2011: Angie: The Collection (Spectrum)
- 2013: Acoustic Routes (Absolute)
- 2016: Colours Are Fading Fast (Earth) with Loren Auerbach
- 2016: From the Outside (Earth)
- 2017: Living in the Shadows (Earth) compiles the albums The Ornament Tree, When the Circus Comes to Town, and Toy Balloon plus a disc of alternate takes, demos, and new songs
- 2017: On the Edge of a Dream (Earth) compiles the albums Crimson Moon, Edge of a Dream, and The Black Swan plus The Setting of the Sun - Demos, Outtakes & Unreleased
- 2018: A Man I'd Rather Be (Part I) (Earth) compiles the albums Bert Jansch, It Don't Bother Me, Jack Orion and Bert and John (duet album with John Renbourn)
- 2018: A Man I'd Rather Be (Part II) (Earth) compiles the albums Nicola, Birthday Blues, Rosemary Lane and Moonshine
- 2022 Bert Jansch At The BBC (Earth) 8-CD / 4-LP set, 147 recordings from 16 December 1966 to 20 September 2000

== Videos ==
- 2007: Fresh As a Sweet Sunday Morning (MVD Visual) live concert from 2006
- 2010: various artists - Crossroads - Eric Clapton Guitar Festival 2010 DVD, Blu Ray (Rhino) - track 1-14, "Blackwaterside"
- 2013: Acoustic Routes PAL DVD (Absolute) - includes performances by Bert Jansch, Anne Briggs, Davey Graham, Wizz Jones, John Renbourn, Ralph McTell, Duck Baker, Brownie McGhee, and others
- 2014: Guitar Artistry of Bert Jansch: Conundrum in Concert 1980 DVD (Vestapol) - the Bert Jansch Conundrum live in Athens OH, followed by Bert in Stockholm (1978), ending with a 1985 documentary
- 2014: Rolly Brown - The Guitar of Bert Jansch 2 DVDs (Stefan Grossman's Guitar Workshop)

== EPs ==
- 1966: Needle of Death EP (Transatlantic)
- 2015: "Davy & Bert Live In Edinburgh" 10" EP (Les Cousins)

== Singles ==
- 1967: "Life Depends on Love"/"A Little Sweet Sunshine" (Big T)
- 1973: "Oh My Father"/"The First Time Ever I Saw Your Face" (Reprise)
- 1974: "In the Bleak Midwinter"/"One For Jo" (non-album A-side) (Charisma)
- 1975: "Dance Lady Dance"/"Build Another Band" (Charisma)
- 1978: "Black Birds of Brittany"/"The Mariner's Farewell" (Streetsong)
- 1980: "Time and Time"/"Una Linea Di Dolcezza" (Kicking Mule)
- 1982: "Heartbreak Hotel"/"Up to the Stars" (Logo)
- 1985: "Playing the Game"/"After the Long Night"
- 2003: "On the Edge of a Dream"/"Walking This Road"/"Crimson Moon" (Sanctuary)
- 2012: "Blackwater Side"/"Heartbreak Hotel" (Spiritual Pajamas)
- 2016: "Black Birds Of Brittany"/"Cuckoo"
- 2017: "The Black Swan"/"The Black Swan (Demo)" (Earth)

== Tribute albums ==
- 2000: various artists - People on the Highway: A Bert Jansch Encomium (Market Square)

== As a member of Pentangle ==
- 1968: The Pentangle (Transatlantic)
- 1968: Sweet Child (Transatlantic)
- 1969: Basket of Light (Transatlantic)
- 1970: Cruel Sister (Transatlantic)
- 1971: Reflection (Transatlantic)
- 1972: Solomon's Seal (Reprise)
- 1985: Open the Door (Spindrift)
- 1986: In the Round (Spindrift)
- 1989: So Early in the Spring (Green Linnet)
- 1991: Think of Tomorrow (Ariola / Hypertension)
- 1993: One More Road (Permanent)
- 2016: Finale: An Evening With... (Topic)

== Collaborations ==
=== With John Renbourn ===
- 1966: Bert and John (Transatlantic)
- 1968: Stepping Stones (Vanguard)

=== With Rod Clements ===
- 1989: Leather Launderette (Black Crow)

== Other appearances ==
- 1971: Anne Briggs - The Time Has Come (CBS)
- 1974: Ralph McTell - Easy (Reprise) - guitar on "Run Johnny, Run"
- 1984: Cliff Aungier - Full Moon (Aries Records)
- 1985: Loren Auerbach with Richard Newman - Playing The Game (Christabel)
- 2001: Hope Sandoval & the Warm Inventions - At the Doorway Again EP (Rough Trade) - guitar on "Charlotte"
- 2002: Candidate - Nuada (Snowstorm) - guitar on "Burrowhead"
- 2007: Babyshambles - Shotter's Nation (Parlophone / Astralwerks) - guitar on "Lost Art Of Murder"
- 2013: Mazzy Star - Seasons of Your Day (Rhymes Of An Hour) guitar on "Spoon"

== As composer ==
=== 1965 - 1969 ===
- 1965: Donovan - Fairytale (Pye) - track 4, "Oh Deed I Do"
- 1965: Julie Felix - The Second Album (Decca) - track 2, "Needle Of Death"
- 1966: Simon & Garfunkel - Sounds of Silence (Columbia) - track 6, "Angie". Jansch's Bert Jansch album cover credits Davey Graham as the composer of "Angie".
- 1967: Donovan - Universal Soldier (Marble Arch) - track 9, "Do You Hear Me Now"
- 1969: Elyse Weinberg - Elyse (Tetragrammaton) - track 2, "Oh Deed I Do"
- 1969: Kenny Rankin - Family (Mercury - track 8, "Needle Of Death"
- 1969: The Alan Tew Orchestra & Chorus - Let's Fly (CBS) - track 6, "Light Flight" (co-written with Danny Thompson, Jacqui McShee, John Renbourn, and Terry Cox

=== 1970-1992 ===
- 1970: Moths - Moths (self-released) - track 1, "I Am Lonely"; track 3, "Travelling Song"; track 7, "Running From Home"; track 9, "Dreams Of Love"
- 1971: Ian & Sylvia - Ian & Sylvia (Columbia) - track 10, "Needle Of Death"
- 1973: Davey Johnstone - Smiling Face (Sound City) - track 7, "After the Dance" (co-written with Bert Jansch)
- 1975: Galaxy-Lin - "G" (Polydor) - track 3, "Hunting Song"
- 1985: Loren Auerbach with Richard Newman - Playing The Game (Christabel) - track 1, "Carousel"; track 3, "Give Me Love"; track 8, "Is It Real"
- 1992: Eriksen - Two Blue (Major Selskapet) - track 7, "Is It Real?"

=== 2000 - 2017 ===
- 2000: Al Stewart - Down in the Cellar (EMI / Miramar) - track 5, "Soho"
- 2003: Currituck Co. - Ghost Man On First (Lexicon Devil / Track & Field) - track 5, "Silly Woman"
- 2004: Martin Archer - Heritage And Ringtones (Discus) - track 3, "It Doesn't Bother Me"
- 2004: The Green House Band - Mirage (Market Square) - track 7, "Mirage"
- 2004: Penelope Houston - Snapshot (Flare Records) - track 2, "I've Got A Feeling" (co-written with Danny Thompson, Jacqui McShee, John Renbourn, and Terry Cox)
- 2006: Bonobo - Days to Come (Ninja Tune) - track 7, "Hatoa" (co-written with Danny Thompson, Jacqui McShee, John Renbourn, and Terry Cox)
- 2009: Lisa Hannigan - Sea Sew (Hoop) - track 7, "Courting Blues"
- 2012: Victor Krummenacher - I Was ANinja Tune Nightmare But I'm Not Going To Go There (Veritas) - track 9, "The Quiet Joys Of Brotherhood" (co-written with Richard Fariña)
- 2012: Quantic and Alice Russell with The Combo Bárbaro - Look Around the Corner (Tru Thoughts) - track 3, "Travelling Song" (co-written with Danny Thompson, Jacqui McShee, John Renbourn, and Terry Cox)
- 2014: Neil Young - A Letter Home (Third Man / Reprise) - track 4, "Needle Of Death"
- 2017: John Renbourn and Wizz Jones -Joint Control (World Music Network) - track B3, "Strolling Down The Highway"; track D1, "Fresh As A Sweet Sunday Morning"; track D3, "Joint Control"
