= Jansch =

Jansch is a surname. Notable people with the surname include:

- Bert Jansch (1943–2011), Scottish folk musician
- Heather Jansch (1948–2021), British sculptor
