= The Dowie Dens o Yarrow =

Scottish border ballad

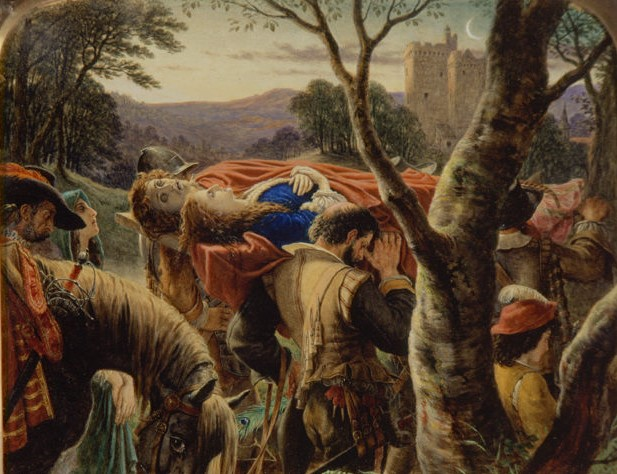
The Dowie Dens o Yarrow (1860), by Joseph Noel Paton

"The Dowie Dens o Yarrow", also known as "The Braes of Yarrow" or simply "Yarrow", is a Scottish border ballad (Roud 13, Child 214). It has many variants (Child collected at least 19) and it has been printed as a broadside, as well as published in song collections. It is considered to be a folk standard, and many different singers have performed and recorded it.

== Synopsis ==
The song describes an unequal conflict between a group of men and one man, concerning a lady. This takes place in the vicinity of Yarrow. The one man succeeds in overcoming nearly all his opponents but is finally defeated by (usually) the last one of them.

In some versions, the lady (who is not usually named) rejects a number (often nine) wealthy suitors, in preference for a servant or ploughman. The nine make a pact to kill the other man and they ambush him in the "Dens of Yarrow".

There lived a lady in the West,
I neer could find her marrow;
She was courted by nine gentlemen
And a ploughboy-lad in Yarrow.

These nine sat drinking at the wine,
Sat drinking wine in Yarrow;
They made a vow among themselves
To fight for her in Yarrow.

In some versions it is unclear who the nine (or other number of men) are; in others, they are brothers or are men sent by the lady's father. In the ensuing fight, eight of the attackers are generally killed or wounded, but the ninth (often identified as the lady's brother, John or Douglas) fatally wounds the victim of the plot, usually by running him through with a sword and often by a cowardly blow, delivered from behind.

Four he hurt, an five he slew,
Till down it fell himsell O;
There stood a fause lord him behin,
Who thrust his body thorrow.

The lady may see the events in a dream, either before or after they take place and usually has some sort of dialogue with her father about the merits of the man who has been ambushed and killed.

"O hold your tongue, my daughter dear,
An tak it not in sorrow;
I’ll wed you wi as good a lord
As you’ve lost this day in Yarrow."

"O haud your tongue, my father dear,
An wed your sons wi sorrow;
For a fairer flower neer sprang in May nor June
Nor I’ve lost this day in Yarrow."

Some versions of the song end with the lady grieving: in others she dies of grief.

== Commentary ==
Dowie is Scots and Northumbrian English for sad, dismal, dull or dispirited, den Scots and Northumbrian for a narrow wooded valley.

The ballad has some similarities with the folk song "Bruton Town" (or "The Bramble Briar"). This song contains a similar murderous plot, usually by a group of brothers, and directed against a servant who has fallen in love with their sister. It also includes the motif, present in some versions of "The Dowie Dens o Yarrow", of the woman dreaming of her murdered lover before discovering the truth of the plot. However, the rhythmical structure of the two songs is quite different and there is no obvious borrowing of phraseology between them.

=== Historical background ===
The song is closely associated with the geographical area of the valley of the Yarrow Water that extends through the Scottish borders towards Selkirk. Almost all versions refer to this location, perhaps because the rhyming scheme for multiple verses, in most versions, relies on words which more or less rhyme with "Yarrow": "marrow", "morrow", "sorrow", "thorough", "narrow", "arrow" and "yellow" for example.

The song is believed to be based on an actual incident. The hero of the ballad was a knight of great bravery, popularly believed to be John Scott, sixth son of the Laird of Harden. According to history, he met a treacherous and untimely death in Ettrick Forest at the hands of his kin, the Scotts of Gilmanscleugh in the seventeenth century. However, recent scholars are sceptical about this story as the origin of the song.

== Cultural relationships ==
=== Standard references ===
- Roud 13
- Child 214
- A version is published in Gordon Hall Gerould's Old English and Medieval Literature

==== Broadsides ====
There are several broadside versions:

- National Library of Scotland, reference RB.m.143(120)

=== Textual variants ===
There are numerous versions of the ballad. Child recorded at least 19, the earliest of which was taken from Walter Scott's Minstrelsy of the Scottish Border (1803). However, the song is much older: William Hamilton of Bangour wrote a poem called "The Braes of Yarrow" which has some basis in the ballad. It appears in a collection of his poems first published in Edinburgh in 1724. It is said to be "written in imitation of an old Scottish ballad on a similar subject". There are also American versions which go under the corrupted title of "Derry Dens of Arrow." The ballad has also been linked to the American folk song "The Wayfaring Stranger," but there is little solid evidence for any relationship between them.

==== Non-English variants ====
Child points out the similarity with "Herr Helmer", a Scandinavian ballad (TSB D 78; SMB 82; DgF 415; NMB 84). In this, Helmer marries a woman whose family are in a state of feud with him because of the unavenged killing of her uncle. Helmer meets his seven brothers-in-law and a fight ensues. He kills six, but spares the seventh who treacherously kills him.

=== Recordings ===
Album/Single	Performer	Year	Variant	Notes
The English and Scottish Popular Ballads, Volume III	Ewan MacColl & A. L. Lloyd	1956	MacColl's version is taken from the singing of his father
Carolyn Hester	Carolyn Hester	1961
Strings and Things	The Corries	1970
Stargazer	Shelagh McDonald	1971
Moonshine	Bert Jansch	1973
As I Went Over Blackwater	Mick Hanly	1980	The Dewey Dens of Yarrow
Open the Door	Pentangle	1985
The Voice of the People: O'er His Grave the Grass Grew Green	John Macdonald	1988
The Voice of the People: It Fell Upon a Bonny Summer's Day	Willie Scott	1988
By Yon Castle Wa'	Heather Heywood	1993
And So It Goes	Steve Tilston	1995
Outlaws and Dreamers	Dick Gaughan	2001	Variant of Child 214S
The Mountain Announces	Scatter	2006
Fairest Floo'er	Karine Polwart	2007
The Voice of the People: Good People Take Warning	Mary Anne Stewart	2012
Fall Away Blues	Red Tail Ring	2016	"Yarrow"
The Back Roads	The Back Roads	2016	"Yarrow"

=== Musical variants ===
The following is the tune as sung by Ewan MacColl:

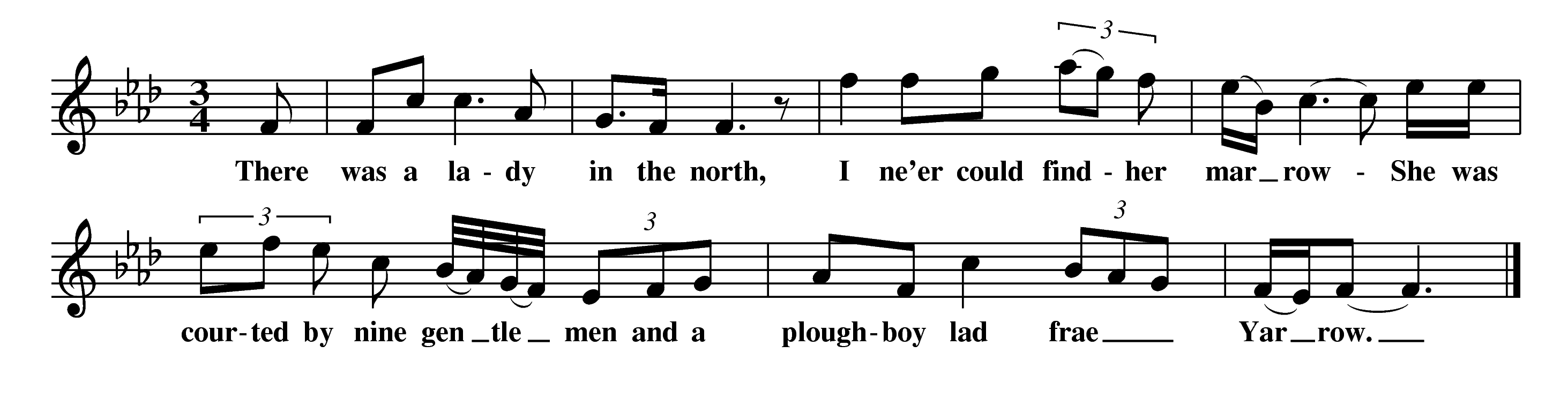

Scottish composer Hamish MacCunn composed an orchestral ballad of the same title.
