= Lucky Thirteen (Bert Jansch album) =

Compilation album by Bert Jansch
- Released: 1966
- Genre: Folk
- Label: Vanguard

Bert Jansch chronology
It Don't Bother Me (1965)	Lucky Thirteen (1966)	Jack Orion (1966)

Professional ratings
Review scores
Source	Rating
Allmusic	4.5/5 stars
Rolling Stone	(positive)

Lucky Thirteen is the first release by Scottish folk musician Bert Jansch in America, compiled from his first two UK albums Bert Jansch and It Don't Bother Me. It was released by Vanguard in 1966.

== Track listing ==
1. "Angie"
2. "Been on the Road So Long" (Alex Campbell)
3. "Running from Home"
4. "Tinker's Blues"
5. "I Have No Time"
6. "Lucky Thirteen" (John Renbourn)
7. "Needle of Death"
8. "Ring a Ding Bird"
9. "Casbah"
10. "Courting Blues"
11. "Oh, My Babe"
12. "Veronica"
13. "Rambling Gonna Be the Death of Me" [sic]
14. "The Wheel"
