= The River Sessions =

The River Sessions may refer to:

- The River Sessions (Gun album), 2006
- The River Sessions (Magnum album), 2004
- The River Sessions (Bert Jansch album), 2004
