= Rosemary Lane =

Rosemary Lane may refer to:

- Rosemary Lane (actress) (1914–1974), one of the Lane Sisters
- Rosemary Lane (song), a British folk song
- Rosemary Lane (album), a 1971 recording by Bert Jansch
