= Sweet Child =

Studio album by Pentangle
- Released: 1 November 1968
- Recorded: Royal Festival Hall, London, 29 June 1968 and IBC Studios 1968
- Genres: Folk, folk rock, folk jazz
- Length: 80:13
- Label: Transatlantic
- Producer: Shel Talmy

Pentangle chronology
The Pentangle (1968)	Sweet Child (1968)	Basket of Light (1969)

Professional ratings
Review scores
Source	Rating
Allmusic	4.5/5 stars
Rolling Stone	(positive)

Sweet Child is a 1968 double album by the British folk-rock band Pentangle: Terry Cox, Bert Jansch, Jacqui McShee, John Renbourn and Danny Thompson.

== Background ==
One disk of the double album was recorded at Pentangle's live concert in the Royal Festival Hall, which took place on 29 June 1968; the other was recorded in the studio. The material is the most wide-ranging of Pentangle's albums, including folk songs, jazz classics, blues, early music and Pentangle's own compositions. The album cover was designed by Peter Blake, better-known for his design of The Beatles' Sgt. Pepper's Lonely Hearts Club Band album.

== Reception ==
In his retrospective review for Allmusic, Matthew Greenwald called the album, "probably the most representative of their work... In all, Sweet Child is an awesome and delightful collection, and probably their finest hour."

== Track listing ==
Royal Festival Hall
No.	Title	Writer(s)	Lead vocals	Length
1.	"Market Song"	Terry Cox, Bert Jansch, Jacqui McShee, John Renbourn, Danny Thompson	Jansch and McShee	4:23
2.	"No More My Lord"	Traditional; arranged by Cox, Jansch, McShee, Renbourn and Thompson	McShee	4:05
3.	"Turn Your Money Green"	Traditional	McShee and Renbourn	2:59
4.	"Haitian Fight Song"	Charles Mingus	None	3:52
5.	"A Woman Like You"	Jansch	Jansch	4:06
6.	"Goodbye Pork Pie Hat"	Mingus	None	3:48
7.	"Three Dances: I. "Brentzel Gay" (Claude Gervaise; arranged by Renbourn and Cox); II. "La Rotta" (Traditional; arranged by Renbourn and Cox); III. "The Earle of Salisbury" (William Byrd)"		None	4:57
8.	"Watch the Stars"	Traditional; arranged by McShee and Renbourn	Renbourn and McShee	3:11
9.	"So Early In the Spring"	Traditional; arranged by McShee	McShee	3:37
10.	"No Exit"	Jansch, Renbourn	None	2:22
11.	"The Time Has Come"	Anne Briggs	McShee	3:14
12.	"Bruton Town"	Traditional; arranged by Cox, Jansch, McShee, Renbourn and Thompson	McShee and Jansch	6:27

CD bonus tracks
No.	Title	Length
13.	"Hear My Call"	3:48
14.	"Let No Man Steal Your Thyme"	2:59
15.	"Bells"	4:45
16.	"Travelling Song"	4:17
17.	"Waltz"	6:00
18.	"Way Behind the Sun"	2:59
19.	"John Donne Song"	3:24

IBC Studios
No.	Title	Writer(s)	Lead vocals	Length
1.	"Sweet Child"	Cox, Jansch, McShee, Renbourn, Thompson	Jansch and McShee	5:15
2.	"I Loved a Lass"	Traditional; arranged by Cox, Jansch, McShee, Renbourn and Thompson	Jansch	2:44
3.	"Three Part Thing"	Jansch, Renbourn, Thompson	None	2:29
4.	"Sovay"	Traditional; arranged by Cox, Jansch, McShee, Renbourn and Thompson	McShee	2:51
5.	"In Time"	Cox, Jansch, Renbourn, Thompson	None	5:09
6.	"In Your Mind"	Cox, Jansch, McShee, Renbourn, Thompson	Jansch, McShee, Renbourn	2:16
7.	"I've Got a Feeling"	Cox, Jansch, McShee, Renbourn, Thompson	McShee	4:29
8.	"The Trees They Do Grow High"	Traditional; arranged by Cox, Jansch, McShee, Renbourn and Thompson	McShee	3:51
9.	"Moon Dog"	Cox	Cox	2:44
10.	"Hole in the Coal"	Ewan MacColl	None	5:23

CD bonus tracks
No.	Title	Length
11.	"Hole in the Coal" (alternate version)	2:44
12.	"The Trees They Do Grow High" (alternate version)	3:52
13.	"Haitian Fight Song" (studio version)	4:20
14.	"In Time" (alternate version)	4:40

== Charts ==
Chart (1972)	Peak position
Australia (Kent Music Report)	55

== Personnel ==
Pentangle

- Jacqui McShee - vocals
- Bert Jansch - acoustic guitar, vocals
- John Renbourn - acoustic guitar, vocals
- Danny Thompson - double bass
- Terry Cox - drums, glockenspiel, vocals

Technical

- Peter Blake - design

== Released versions ==
Sweet Child was originally released in the UK, as a double LP, on 1 November 1968 as Transatlantic TRA178. The US release, in the same year, was Reprise 2R56334. A CD version was released in 1992 as Line TACD9005. Some of the stage banter in the live section has been cut from this version. In 2001, a digitally remastered version was released as Castle CMDDD132, including several versions of some of the studio takes and some additional songs from the Festival Hall concert: "Hear my Call", "Let No Man Steal Your Thyme", "Bells", "Travelling Song", "Waltz", "Way Behind The Sun" and "Go and Catch a Falling Star".
