= The Pentangle (album) =

Studio album by Pentangle
- Released: 17 May 1968
- Recorded: February – March 1968
- Studio: IBC Studios and Olympic Sound Studio, London, England.
- Genre: Folk, folk rock
- Length: 30:52
- Label: Transatlantic
- Producer: Shel Talmy

Pentangle chronology
The Pentangle (1968)	Sweet Child (1968)

Professional ratings
Review scores
Source	Rating
Allmusic	4.5/5 stars
Rolling Stone	(positive)
Encyclopedia of Popular Music	5/5 stars

The Pentangle is the 1968 debut album of the band Pentangle: Terry Cox, Bert Jansch, Jacqui McShee, John Renbourn and Danny Thompson. It brought together their separate influences of folk, jazz, blues, early music and contemporary songwriting. One of the band's most commercially successful albums, it reached number 21 in the British charts.

== Background ==
By the time the album was produced, the members of Pentangle were already accomplished musicians, in their own fields, and had played together in various combinations. Jansch and Renbourn were recognised as solo artists and played together regularly, including their recording of the Bert and John album. McShee had sung folk and blues in pubs and clubs, and had recorded with Renbourn on Another Monday. Cox and Thompson were experienced session musicians and had played together in Alexis Korner's band. The album's liner notes were written by radio personality John Peel.

== Reception ==
Richie Unterberger said of the album "If it was more a folk-jazz-blues stew than it was folk-rock, it certainly rocked with a beat, and was executed with vocal harmonies, vocal and instrumental solo trade-offs, and a daring, irreverent spirit that immediately connected with rock-oriented listeners. And rock listeners, rather than folk ones, probably comprised the majority of the Pentangle's audience." In his Allmusic retrospective review, Ronnie D. Lankford wrote, "There's something exciting about the first album of a band that goes on to greatness, and The Pentangle, by the group of the same name, is no different. Here, the listener witnesses the first studio work of a band struggling to get their essence down on vinyl... Equally comfortable with traditional songs, instrumentals, and originals, they made few missteps on their early albums."

== Track listing ==
Side one
No.	Title	Writer(s)	Length
1.	"Let No Man Steal Your Thyme"	Traditional; arranged by Jansch, McShee and Cox	2:37
2.	"Bells"	Pentangle	3:52
3.	"Hear My Call"	The Staple Singers	3:01
4.	"Pentangling"	Pentangle	7:02

Side two
No.	Title	Writer(s)	Length
5.	"Mirage"	Bert Jansch	2:00
6.	"Way Behind the Sun"	Traditional; arranged by Jansch, Thompson, McShee, Renbourn and Cox	3:01
7.	"Bruton Town"	Traditional; arranged by Jansch, Thompson, McShee, Renbourn and Cox	5:05
8.	"Waltz"	Pentangle	4:54

== Personnel ==
Pentangle

- Jacqui McShee – vocals
- Bert Jansch – acoustic guitar, vocals
- John Renbourn – acoustic guitar, vocals
- Danny Thompson – double bass
- Terry Cox – drums, vocals

Technical

- John Peel – sleeve notes
- Robert Dowling – cover photography

== Released versions ==
The Pentangle album was released in the UK as an LP as Transatlantic TRA162 on 17 May 1968. The U.S. version was also released in 1968 as Reprise RSLP63 15. A CD version was released as Transatlantic TACD 9.00549 O and a digitally remastered version as Castle CMRCD131, in 2001. The digitally remastered version includes some additional tracks: "Koan", "The Wheel", "Casbah" and four alternate takes of other album tracks.
