= Sweet Sweet Music =

Live album by Bert Jansch
- Released: 13 February 2012
- Recorded: 22 April 2006, recorded live at the Sheffield Memorial Hall, England.
- Genre: Folk
- Label: Secret Records
- Producer: Roger Lomas, Rich Evatt

Bert Jansch chronology
Dazzling Stranger: The Bert Jansch Anthology (2000)	Sweet Sweet Music (2012)

Sweet Sweet Music is a live album by the late Scottish folk musician Bert Jansch, released on 13 February 2012. This album is amongst the last of his live recordings.

== Track listing ==
All tracks composed by Bert Jansch; except where indicated

1. "It Don't Bother Me"
2. "Strolling Down the Highway"
3. "Blackwaterside"
4. "My Pocket's Empty Baby"
5. "Fresh as a Sweet Sunday Morning"
6. "Rosemary Lane"
7. "Blues Run the Game" (Jackson C. Frank)
8. "Courting Blues"
9. "Reynardine"
10. "Poison"
11. "October Song" (Robin Williamson)
12. "Hey Pretty Girl"
