= Thirteen Down =

Studio album by Bert Jansch
- Released: July 1980 in the UK (credited as "The Bert Jansch Conundrum")
- Recorded: 1979 at Livingstone Studios, London
- Genre: Folk
- Length: 38:53
- Label: Sonet
- Producer: Bert Jansch, Martin Jenkins, Portman Smith and Nic Kinsey

Bert Jansch chronology
Avocet (1979)	Thirteen Down (1980)	Heartbreak (1982)

Professional ratings
Review scores
Source	Rating
Allmusic	4/5 stars

Thirteen Down is the 13th album by Scottish folk musician Bert Jansch, released in 1980. The album, credited as "The Bert Jansch Conundrum", originally appeared with at least three different sleeves, in the UK, US and Australia. There were also, on some or all of these packagings, dubious writing credits for "If I Had A Lover" and "Sweet Mother Earth", adaptations of a Swedish and Brazilian song respectively.

== Track listing ==
1. "Una Linea Di Dolcezza" (Jansch) - 3:40
2. "Let Me Sing" (Jansch) - 3:06
3. "Down River" (Jansch) - 3:17
4. "Nightfall" (Jenkins) - 2:56
5. "If I Had a Lover" (Jansch) - 2:15
6. "Time And Time" (Jansch) - 3:10
7. "In My Mind" (Jansch) - 2:22
8. "Sovay" (Trad., arr. Jansch, Jenkins, Smith) - 2:55
9. "Where Did My Life Go" (Jansch) - 2:56
10. "Single Rose" (Jansch) - 2:50
11. "Ask Your Daddy" (Jansch) - 2:57
12. "Sweet Mother Earth" (Milton Nascimento / Chico Buarque - "O cio da Terra") - 3:48
13. "Bridge" (Jansch, Jenkins) - 2:34

== Personnel ==
- Bert Jansch - guitar, vocals
- Martin Jenkins - mandocello, violin, flute, vocals
- Nigel Portman Smith - bass, Fender Rhodes, accordion
- Luce Langridge - drums, percussion
- Jacqui McShee - lead vocals on 5
