= Goodbye Pork Pie Hat =

Composition by Charles Mingus

from the album Mingus Ah Um
- Released: 1959
- Genre: Jazz
- Length: 5:42
- Label: Columbia
- Composer: Charles Mingus
- Producer: Teo Macero

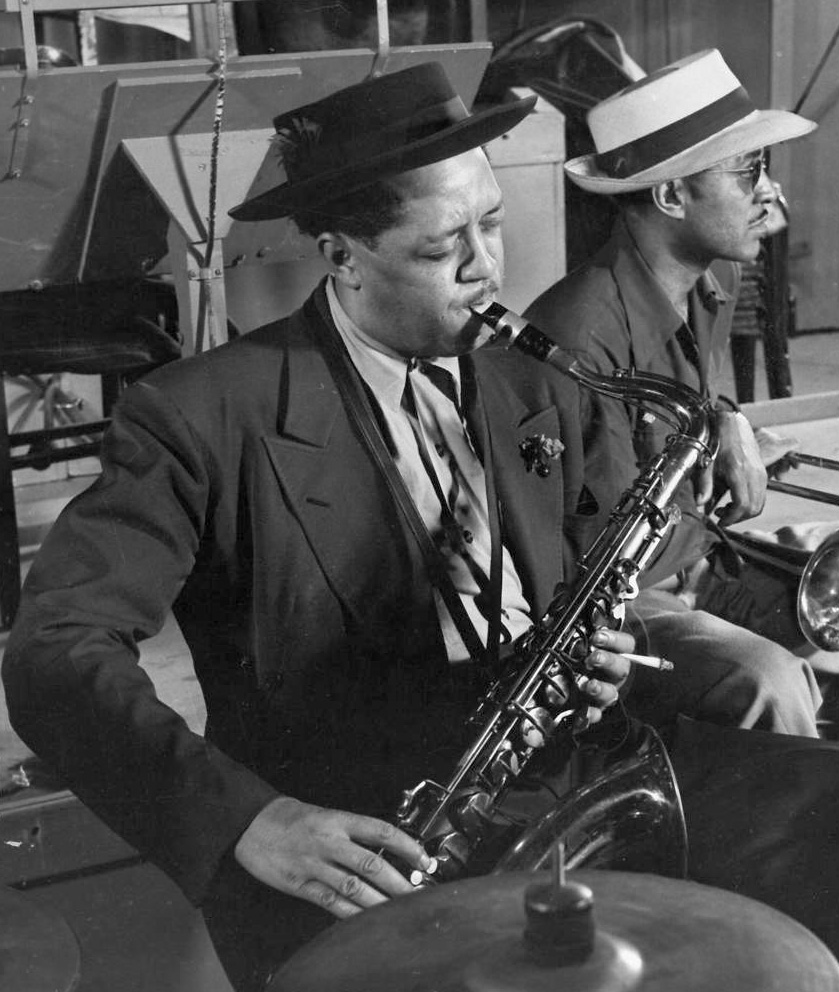
Lester Young (left) wearing his pork pie hat.

"Goodbye Pork Pie Hat" is a jazz instrumental composed by Charles Mingus, originally recorded by his sextet in 1959 and released on his album Mingus Ah Um. One of Mingus's best-known compositions, "Goodbye Pork Pie Hat" became a jazz standard, recorded by other jazz and jazz fusion artists.

Mingus wrote it as an elegy for saxophonist Lester Young, who had died two months prior to the recording session and who was known for wearing unusually broad-brimmed pork pie hats. These were "busted down" by Young himself, from hats that might better be described as Homburgs, but which he only purchased in "Negro districts". This was since, according to an interview with Young in the November 1949 edition of Our World, "You can't get the right type in a 'gray' neighborhood". In June 2026, CBS News included the song in its list of the 250 essential American songs of the past 250 years.

== Lyrics ==
Originally written as an instrumental piece, lyrics have been added on a number of occasions. Rahsaan Roland Kirk performed lyrics for the song on his 1976 album, The Return of the 5000 Lb. Man. Joni Mitchell did so on her 1979 album Mingus. English folk singer June Tabor recorded it with Kirk's lyrics on an album of jazz standards released in 1989. Lyrics have also been added by Vin D'Onofrio (whose version was recorded by the Japanese singer and pianist, Chie Ayado) and by the American jazz artist Lauren Hooker. Hooker's lyrics differ radically from those in earlier versions in that they address the experience of domestic abuse, perpetrated by a man who wears a pork pie hat, rather than celebrating the life and music of Lester Young in the manner favored by Kirk and Mitchell.

== Other versions ==
Mingus re-released the song on his 1963 album Mingus Mingus Mingus Mingus Mingus as "Theme for Lester Young" and on 1977's Three or Four Shades of Blues.

An early indication of the song's cross-genre appeal came in 1966, when it was recorded by the British folk guitar duo, Bert Jansch and John Renbourn. Rather than offering a tightly arranged collaboration between the two musicians, Jansch and Renbourn's rendition was recorded in hard stereo, with each guitarist offering a different interpretation of the tune. When Jansch and Renbourn formed Pentangle the next year, a group arrangement of the song became a fixture in their set, and a version recorded live at the Royal Festival Hall in London was released on Sweet Child in 1968. Though Pentangle included a lead vocalist and three of the four instrumentalists also sang, no attempt was made to add lyrics or scat. Renbourn returned to it again in 1985, this time with the American blues guitarist, Stefan Grossman.

It was recorded in March 1971 by John McLaughlin for his album My Goal's Beyond. Like Renbourn with Pentangle and then Grossman, McLaughlin was also returning to the song. He had been involved in a live recording of the song in London in 1967, when he played guitar for the Mike Carr Trio. Jeff Beck (guitar) performed an interpretation of the song in his 1976 album Wired, as did Derek Sherinian (keyboards) in his 2001 album Inertia. Bernie Worrell also offered a solo piano version on his 2013 album: Elevation: The Upper Air.

The song was also recorded by Stanley Clarke on his release If This Bass Could Only Talk for the Epic label in 1988.

== Personnel ==
Mingus Ah Um (1959) version

- John Handy – tenor saxophone
- Booker Ervin – tenor saxophone
- Horace Parlan – piano
- Charles Mingus – double bass
- Dannie Richmond – drums

== Bibliography ==
- Gioia, Ted (2012). The Jazz Standards: A Guide to the Repertoire. Oxford University Press. p. 136. ISBN 9780199769155.
