= Jack Orion =

Studio album by Bert Jansch
- Released: September 1966 (UK)
- Recorded: c. early summer 1966
- Studio: 5 North Villas, Camden, London
- Genre: Folk
- Length: 44:30
- Label: Transatlantic
- Producer: Bill Leader

Bert Jansch chronology
| Lucky Thirteen (1965) | Jack Orion (1966) | Bert and John (1966) |

Professional ratings
Review scores
| Source | Rating |
|---|---|
| AllMusic | link |
| The Encyclopedia of Popular Music | 4/5 stars |
| Uncut | 3/5 stars |

Jack Orion is the third album by Scottish folk musician Bert Jansch, released in 1966. It contains a number of traditional songs, including the epic "Jack Orion": a ten-minute adaptation of the Child ballad "Glasgerion" which tells of a court fiddler's attempt to seduce a countess and his servant's treachery in successfully impersonating him. A number of songs are performed with friend and fellow guitarist John Renbourn, who would later join him in the group Pentangle. "The Waggoner’s Lad" has Jansch unusually playing the banjo with Renbourn supplying the guitar part.

== Track listing ==
Side one
| No. | Title | Writer(s) | Length |
|---|---|---|---|
| 1. | "The Waggoner's Lad" (instrumental) | traditional | 3:32 |
| 2. | "The First Time Ever I Saw Your Face" | Ewan McColl; instrumental arranged by Bert Jansch | 1:45 |
| 3. | "Jack Orion" | traditional | 9:50 |

Side two
| No. | Title | Writer(s) | Length |
|---|---|---|---|
| 1. | "The Gardener" | traditional | 1:40 |
| 2. | "Nottamun Town" | traditional | 4:30 |
| 3. | "Henry Martin" | traditional | 3:17 |
| 4. | "Blackwaterside" | traditional | 3:49 |
| 5. | "Pretty Polly" | traditional | 4:07 |

Additional Personnel John Renbourn - guitar on 1, 3, 6 & 8

1970 US and 1991 Vanguard CD track listing
| No. | Title | Writer(s) | Length |
|---|---|---|---|
| 1. | "The Waggoner's Lad" | traditional | 3:32 |
| 2. | "Blackwaterside" | traditional | 3:49 |
| 3. | "The First Time I Ever Saw Your Face" | Ewan McColl | 1:45 |
| 4. | "900 Miles" (from It Don't Bother Me UK release) | traditional | 3:08 |
| 5. | "The Gardener" | traditional | 1:40 |
| 6. | "Pretty Polly" | traditional | 4:07 |
| 7. | "Nottamun Town" | traditional | 4:30 |
| 8. | "Henry Martin" | traditional | 3:17 |
| 9. | "Jack Orion" | traditional | 9:50 |

== See also ==
- Folk music
