= The River Sessions (Bert Jansch album) =

Live album by Bert Jansch
- Released: 2004
- Recorded: 18 November 1974
- Genre: Folk
- Length: 57'48
- Label: River Records

The River Sessions is a live album by Scottish folk musician Bert Jansch, released in 2004. The CD contains a track-by-track commentary (state to be done by Bert Jansch). It's a recording of a solo Bert Jansch concert, from City Hall in Glasgow, on November 18, 1974. In 1973, Bert Jansch left Pentangle and the band split. He returned to a solo career and released in a group setting L.A. Turnaround in September 1974. Eight of the fourteen tracks on this live album come from that LP. This is the unique recording available on CD of a live solo rendition of the tracks.

The track Stone Monkey is an allusion to the sixteenth-century Chinese book Journey To The West, published anonymously. Bert Jansch read an abridged translation made by Arthur Waley and simply called Monkey. The novel is a fictionalised account of the legends about the Buddhist monk Xuánzàng's pilgrimage to India during the Táng dynasty in order to obtain Buddhist religious texts called sutras.

On this live recording, Bert Jansch gives explanations before the tracks.

== Track listing ==
1. "Build Another Band" - 4:13
2. "I've Got A Feeling" - 5:22
3. "One For Jo" - 3:47
4. "The Blacksmith" - 4:08
5. "Travellin' Man" - 4:01
6. "Lady Nothynges Toye Puffe" (Lady Nothing) - 2:28
7. "Fresh As A Sweet Sunday Morning" - 4:07
8. "Angi" - 5:31
9. "Stone Monkey" - 5:18
10. "Dance Lady Dance" - 2:33
11. "When I Get Home" - 4:46
12. "In The Bleak Mid-Winter" - 3:26
13. "Key To The Highway" - 4:21
14. "Chambertin" - 3:47

== Credits ==
Bert Jansch - Vocals, Acoustic guitar

== Notes ==
Inside the CD, you can read "The quotes are from March 2004 interview with Bert at his home in London."
