= Avocet (album) =

Studio album by Bert Jansch
- Released: May 1979 in UK; 1978 in Denmark
- Recorded: February 1978 at Sweet Silence Studios, Copenhagen
- Genre: Folk
- Length: 37:06
- Label: Charisma; Earth Recordings (2016 reissue)
- Producer: Bert Jansch

Bert Jansch chronology
A Rare Conundrum (1977)	Avocet (1979)	Thirteen Down (1980)

Professional ratings
Review scores
Source	Rating
AllMusic	4/5 stars
The Encyclopedia of Popular Music	4/5 stars
Music Week	4/4 stars

Avocet is the 12th album by Scottish folk musician Bert Jansch, released in 1979 in UK. The album was first released by Ex Libris Records in Denmark in late 1978 with alternate album cover and one alternate track title, although no difference in recorded content. The title track "Avocet" was inspired by the traditional song "The Cuckoo". All tracks on the album are named after a sea bird or wading bird.

On 5 February 2016, Earth Recordings reissued the album (remastered by Brian Pyle, with new sleeve art) in digital, CD, and vinyl formats; the latter available in an 'art edition' which included six lithograph prints of illustrations of each of the birds on the album, made by Hannah Alice.

== Track listing ==
All tracks composed by Bert Jansch; except where indicated

- (All the tracks on this album are instrumentals)
1. "Avocet" - 17:59
2. "Lapwing" - 1:33
3. "Bittern" - 7:49
4. "Kingfisher" - 3:44
5. "Osprey" (Martin Jenkins) - 3:14
6. "Kittiwake" - 2:47

== Personnel ==
- Bert Jansch - guitar, piano
- Martin Jenkins - mandocello, violin, flute
- Danny Thompson - bass
