= Heartbreak (Bert Jansch album) =

Studio album by Bert Jansch
- Released: April 1982
- Recorded: June 1981
- Studio: Silverlake Studio, Los Angeles
- Genre: Folk
- Label: Logo
- Producer: John Chelew, Richard Chelew

Bert Jansch chronology
Thirteen Down (1980)	Heartbreak (1982)	From the Outside (1985)

Heartbreak is the 14th album by Scottish folk musician Bert Jansch, released in 1982.

== Track listing ==
All tracks composed by Bert Jansch; except where indicated

1. "Is It Real?"
2. "Up to the Stars"
3. "Give Me the Time"
4. "If I Were a Carpenter" (Tim Hardin)
5. "Wild Mountain Thyme" (Traditional)
6. "Heartbreak Hotel" (Mae Boren Axton, Thomas Durden, Elvis Presley)
7. "Sit Down Beside Me"
8. "No Rhyme Nor Reason"
9. "Blackwaterside" (Traditional)
10. "Not a Word Was Said"

=== 2012 Deluxe Edition ===
Disc 1

Same as the original LP release; the limited edition has a different running order, according to original production this should be the correct running order.

Disc 2 - Live At McCabe's Guitar Shop

1. "The Curragh Of Kildare"
2. "Poor Mouth"
3. "Blackwaterside"
4. "One For Jo"
5. "Let Me Sing"
6. "If I Were a Carpenter"
7. "Blues Run The Game"
8. "Is It Real?"
9. "Ask Your Daddy"
10. "The First Time Ever I Saw Your Face"
11. "Kingfisher"
12. "Wild Mountain Thyme"
13. "Come Back Baby"
14. "I Am Lonely"

== Personnel ==
- Bert Jansch - guitar, vocals
- Albert Lee - guitar, mandolin
- Randy Tico - bass
- Matt Betton - drums
- Jack Kelly - drums
- Jennifer Warnes - backing vocals on 5
