= In the Round =

Studio album by Pentangle
- Released: 1986
- Genre: Folk, folk rock, pop jazz
- Label: Spindrift
- Producer: Doug Beveridge, Roger Wake, Pentangle

Pentangle chronology
Open The Door (1985)	In the Round (1986)	Essential Vol 1 (1987)

Professional ratings
Review scores
Source	Rating
Allmusic	3/5 stars

In the Round is an album by Pentangle, jointly produced by Doug Beveridge, Roger Wake, and Pentangle. It was issued in 1986 on Spindrift SPIN 120 in 1986 and on Varrick CDVR026 (CD) VR026 (LP) and CVR026 (cassette) in 1990. There is a typo on the sleeve, as it credits the licence to "Jackie" McShee, not Jacqui McShee. There is also a widespread use of the name "Vanick", a mistake for "Varrick". It was reissued in 1988 on Plane CD88505. It was reissued in 2006 on Talking Elephant. Nigel Portman Smith replaced original bassist Danny Thompson.

== Track listing ==
1. "Play the Game" (Jacqui McShee, Nigel Portman Smith)
2. "The Open Sea" (Bert Jansch)
3. "She Moved Through the Fair" (Traditional; arranged by Pentangle)
4. "Set Me Free (When the Night Is Over)" (Terry Cox)
5. "Come to Me Baby" (Jansch, Portman Smith)
6. "Sunday Morning Blues" (McShee, Mike Piggott, Jansch)
7. "Chase That Devil Away" (Cox)
8. "The Saturday Movie" (Jansch)
9. "Süil Agrar" (Traditional; arranged by Pentangle)
10. "Circle the Moon" (Jansch, Portman Smith)
11. "Let Me Be" (Jansch)

== Personnel ==
Pentangle

- Mike Piggott - violin, acoustic and electric guitars
- Nigel Portman Smith - bass, keyboards, piano, vocals
- Bert Jansch - acoustic guitar, banjo, vocals
- Terry Cox - drums, DX-7, percussion, vocals
- Jacqui McShee - vocals
- Pam McShee - lead vocals on "Süil Agrar", backing vocals on "Play the Game"
