= The Bramble Briar =

Traditional English folk murder ballad

Song
- Written: Unknown
- Genre: Murder ballad
- Songwriter(s): Unknown

"The Bramble Briar", "The Merchant's Daughter" or "In Bruton Town" (Roud 18; Laws M32) is a traditional English folk murder ballad that tells the story of how two brothers murder a servant who is courting their sister. There are many versions of the song going by a number of different titles.

== Synopsis ==
A girl of noble birth falls in love with a servant and the two agree to get married. However, her two brothers discover the tryst and, because they consider him too low-born for her, decide to murder him. They go out hunting in the woods early in the morning and take the servant along with them. One of the brothers kills the man and hides the body in a bramble thicket. Once back home, their sister asks them why they are whispering to each other and what has become of the servant. One of the brothers tells her that they have lost him somewhere that he will never be found. That night the girl dreams of her lover. He is dead and covered in blood. The following day, she goes out to the woods where she eventually finds the corpse in the briars. She kisses his dead lips and sits mourning with his body for three days. When she at last returns, her brothers ask her why she is whispering and she tells them to get away from her, calling them "bloody butchers". In other versions of the story, she severs the head of the unfortunate victim, and takes it back with her in a jar.

== Commentary ==
The ballad was collected by Cecil Sharp in 1904 but is considerably older than that. It is a re-telling of a 14th-century tale called Isabella and the Pot of Basil by Boccaccio although, according to The Penguin Book of English Folk Songs the story was probably not new even then. The English romantic poet, John Keats, adapted the story into a poem called Isabella, or the Pot of Basil. Pre-Raphaelite artist William Holman Hunt illustrated Keats's poem in his painting, Isabella and the Pot of Basil, in 1868.

== Authentic field recordings (selection) ==
- Eliza Pace of Hyden, Kentucky was recorded by Alan Lomax in 1937
- Doney Hammontree of Bethel Grove, Washington County, Arkansas was recorded by Irene Carlisle Jones in 1951
- Carolyne Hughes of Blandford Forum, Dorset, England was recorded by Peter Kennedy in 1968
- Nelson Ridley of Kent, England was recorded by Ewan MacColl and Peggy Seeger in 1974
- Lena Bare Turbyfill of Elk Park, North Carolina, was recorded by Herbert Halpert, in 1939 for the Works Progress Administration

== Revival recordings ==
Many musicians have recorded versions of the song, most of which were based on the version collected by Cecil Sharp from Emma Overd of Langport, Somerset, England in 1904.

- Martin Carthy on his 1966 Second Album
- Davey Graham on his 1968 album Large as Life and Twice as Natural
- Maddy Prior and Tim Hart on their 1968 album Folk Songs of Old England Vol. 1
- Jacqui McShee with Pentangle on their 1968 album The Pentangle and live on their 1968 album Sweet Child
- Sandy Denny, live in 1972, released on her 1986 album Who Knows Where the Time Goes?
- Martin Simpson on his 2001 album The Bramble Briar.

Using the title "Bramble Briar":

- Louis Killen on his 1964 album English and Scottish Folk Ballads
- Meg Baird, Helena Espvall & Sharron Kraus on their 2006 album Leaves From Off The Tree
