= Leather Launderette =

Studio album by Bert Jansch
- Released: March 1989
- Recorded: January 1988
- Studio: Cluny Studios, Newcastle-upon-Tyne
- Genre: Folk
- Label: Black Crow
- Producer: Geoff Heslop

Bert Jansch chronology
From the Outside (1985)	Leather Launderette (1989)	Sketches (1990)

Leather Launderette is the 16th album by Scottish folk musician Bert Jansch, recorded together with fellow musician Rod Clements. The album was released in March 1989. Jansch had health problems during the recording, and in 1987, after being rushed to hospital, he quit drinking alcohol. Colin Harper says in his Bert Jansch biography, Dazzling Stranger, "There can be no doubt that Bert's creativity, reliability, energy, commitment and quality of performance were all rescued dramatically by the decision to quit boozing".

== Track listing ==
All tracks composed by Bert Jansch; except where indicated

1. "Strolling Down The Highway"
2. "Sweet Rose"
3. "Brafferton"
4. "Ain't No More Cane" (Traditional)
5. "Why Me?"
6. "Sundown Station
7. "Knight's Move"
8. "Brownsville"
9. "Bogie's Bonnie Belle" (Traditional)
10. "Leather Launderette"
11. "Been On The Road So Long" (Alex Campbell)

== Personnel ==
- Bert Jansch - guitar, banjo, vocals
- Rod Clements - electric & acoustic guitars, mandolin, bass, lead vocals on 4, 6, 8 and 10
- Marty Craggs - backing vocals
