= Nicola (album) =

Studio album by Bert Jansch
- Released: July 1967
- Recorded: c. April 1967
- Studio: Decca Studios, London; Sound Techniques, London
- Genre: Folk rock; folk baroque; progressive folk; folk blues
- Length: 39:19
- Label: Transatlantic
- Producer: Nathan Joseph

Bert Jansch chronology
Bert and John (1966)	Nicola (1967)	Birthday Blues (1969)

Professional ratings
Review scores
Source	Rating
AllMusic	3/5 stars
Uncut	1/5 stars

Nicola is the fifth album by Scottish folk musician Bert Jansch, released in 1967. An orchestrated version of "Train Song" was attempted during the Nicola sessions but, while fondly remembered by arranger Dee Palmer (credited under the birthname David Palmer), did not make the finished product. Neither did two further outtakes "In This Game" and "Dissatisfied Blues" (both of which he performed live during the city hall tour of early 1967) although they later appeared on Box of Love - The Bert Jansch Sampler Vol. 2 (1972), issued on Transatlantic shortly after Bert had left the label. They have also been resurrected on the new reissue of Nicola.

== Track listing ==
1. "Go Your Way My Love" (Jansch, Anne Briggs)
2. "Woe Is Love My Dear" (Jansch)
3. "Nicola" (Jansch)
4. "Come Back Baby" (Walter Davis)
5. "A Little Sweet Sunshine" (Jansch)
6. "Love Is Teasing" (Traditional)
7. "Rabbit Run" (Jansch)
8. "Life Depends on Love" (Jansch)
9. "Weeping Willow Blues" (Traditional)
10. "Box of Love" (Jansch)
11. "Wish My Baby Was Here" (Jansch)
12. "If the World Isn't There" (Jansch)
13. "In This Game" (Jansch) [re-release only]
14. "Dissatisfied Blues" (Jansch) [re-release only]
