= Open the Door (Pentangle album) =

Studio album by Pentangle
- Released: July 1985
- Studio: Livingston Studios, London
- Genre: Folk jazz, British folk rock
- Label: Spindrift
- Producer: John Chelew, Richard Chelew

Pentangle chronology
At Their Best (1983)	Open the Door (1985)	In the Round (1986)

Professional ratings
Review scores
Source	Rating
Allmusic	4/5 stars
Sounds	4/5 stars

Open the Door is an album by Pentangle. The band had split in 1973 and reformed in the early 1980s. By the time this album was recorded, John Renbourn had left the band to enroll in a music degree course and his place was taken by Mike Piggott. The other band members were unchanged from the original Pentangle line-up: Terry Cox, Bert Jansch, Jacqui McShee and Danny Thompson. It was produced by John Chelew.

The album was released in 1985 on Spindrift, SPIN 111. Some sources give 1982, 1983 or 1984 (perhaps because recording began in 1983 and the 'published' and 'copyright' dates on the album are 1984, suggesting that it had been planned for an earlier release). In the United States It was released on Varrick VR017 (LP) and CRV017 (Cassette). It was re-released in 2006 on Talking Elephant, the longest time that has ever passed for an original Pentangle album to become available on CD. Compared to their previous recordings it was relatively poorly reviewed. Varrick is an American label that also brought some Fairport Convention albums back into print.

== Track listing ==
All tracks composed by Pentangle; except where noted.

1. "Open the Door" (Traditional; arranged by Pentangle)
2. "Dragonfly"
3. "Sweet Mother Earth" (Milton Nascimento/Chico Buarque)
4. "Child of the Winter"
5. "The Dolphin"
6. "Lost Love" (Bert Jansch)
7. "Sad Lady"
8. "Taste of Love"
9. "Yarrow" (Traditional; arranged by Pentangle)
10. "Street Song"

== Personnel ==
Pentangle

- Terry Cox – drums, percussion, vocals
- Bert Jansch – acoustic guitar, vocals
- Jacqui McShee – vocals
- Mike Piggott – violin, acoustic and electric guitar
- Danny Thompson – double bass

Technical

- Jerry Boys – engineer
- Peter Bucker – cover illustration, design
