= Moonshine (Bert Jansch album) =

Studio album by Bert Jansch
- Released: February 1973
- Recorded: May 1972 in London (Sound Techniques?)
- Genre: Folk baroque, British folk rock
- Label: Reprise; Earth Recordings (2015 reissue)
- Producer: Danny Thompson

Bert Jansch chronology
Rosemary Lane (1971)	Moonshine (1973)	L.A. Turnaround (1974)

Professional ratings
Review scores
Source	Rating
Allmusic	4/5 stars

Moonshine is the eighth album by Scottish folk musician Bert Jansch, released in 1973.

On 16 October 2015, Earth Recordings reissued the album in digital, CD, and vinyl formats; the latter additionally available as a picture disc.

== Track listing ==
1. "Yarrow" (Traditional; arranged by Bert Jansch) - 5:09
2. "Brought with the Rain" (Jansch, traditional) - 2:55
3. "The January Man" (Dave Goulder) - 3:31
4. "Night Time Blues" (Jansch) - 7:14
5. "Moonshine" (Jansch) - 4:56
6. "The First Time Ever I Saw Your Face" (Ewan MacColl) - 3:00
7. "Ramble Away" (Traditional; arranged by Bert Jansch) - 4:35
8. "Twa Corbies" (Traditional; arranged by Bert Jansch) - 3:00
9. "Oh My Father" (Jansch) - 4:07

== Personnel ==
- Bert Jansch - vocals, guitars
- Danny Thompson - bass
- Tony Visconti - electric bass, recorder, percussion, musical arrangements
- Gary Boyle - electric guitar
- Aly Bain - fiddle
- Ralph McTell - harmonica
- Skaila Kanga - harp
- Laurie Allan - drums
- Dave Mattacks - drums
- Dannie Richmond - drums on 6
- Mary Hopkin - lead vocals on 6
- Les Quatre Flute a Bec Consort - flutes
- Richard Adeney - flute
- Thea King - clarinet
- Marilyn Sanson - cello

Technical

- Danny Thompson - producer
- John Wood, Victor Gamm - engineers
- Heather Jansch - cover design
