= The Black Swan (Bert Jansch album) =

Studio album by Bert Jansch
- Released: 18 September 2006
- Genre: Folk
- Label: Drag City
- Producers: Noah Georgeson, Bert Jansch

Bert Jansch chronology
Edge of a Dream (2002)	The Black Swan (2006)	Fresh As a Sweet Sunday Morning (2007)

Professional ratings
Review scores
Source	Rating
AllMusic	4/5 stars
Pitchfork Media	7.9/10

The Black Swan is the 23rd and final studio album by the Scottish folk singer Bert Jansch. It was released in 2006 through Drag City. Jansch described the album: "It's been fantastic working with everyone who's been involved on the record. They all came to it from a standpoint of being fans of my music, so while there are lots of great musicians making wonderful contributions to the record it still has a very acoustic, intimate feel – and there's still a lot of me on there!"

== Track listing ==
All tracks composed by Bert Jansch, except where indicated

1. "The Black Swan" - features Helena Espvall - 6:25
2. "High Days" - 3:47
3. "When the Sun Comes Up" - features Beth Orton - 3:54
4. "Katie Cruel" (traditional, arr. Jansch) - features Beth Orton and Devendra Banhart - 2:59
5. "My Pocket's Empty" (traditional, arr. Jansch) - 3:49
6. "Watch the Stars" (traditional, arr. Jansch) - features Beth Orton and Kevin Barker - 2:54
7. "A Woman Like You" - 4:13
8. "The Old Triangle" (Brendan Behan) - 4:06
9. "Bring Your Religion" - 3:05
10. "Texas Cowboy Blues" - 3:07
11. "Magdalina's Dance" (Jansch, Paul Wassif) - 3:19
12. "Hey Pretty Girl" - 3:03

== Personnel ==
- Bert Jansch: guitar and vocals
- Beth Orton: vocals (3, 4 & 6), guitar (6)
- Devendra Banhart: vocals (4)
- Paul Wassif: guitar (5), slide guitar (7), banjo (11)
- Noah Georgeson: percussion (1), bass (9 & 10)
- Otto Hauser: drums (3, 5, 6 & 9), percussion (4 & 7)
- Kevin Barker: lead guitar (6), percussion (4)
- Helena Espvall: cello (1)
- Adam Jansch: keyboards (1 & 9)
- David Roback: slide guitar (3)
- Richard Good: slide guitar (9)
- Pete Newsom: drums (10)
- Maggie Boyle: flute (11)
