= Birthday Blues (album) =

Studio album by Bert Jansch
- Released: January 1969
- Recorded: c. October–November 1968
- Studio: IBC, London
- Genre: Folk rock, folk baroque
- Label: Transatlantic
- Producer: Shel Talmy

Bert Jansch chronology
| Nicola (1967) | Birthday Blues (1969) | Rosemary Lane (1971) |

Professional ratings
Review scores
| Source | Rating |
|---|---|
| AllMusic | 4.5/5 stars |
| Uncut | 2/5 stars |

Birthday Blues is the sixth album by Scottish folk musician Bert Jansch, released in 1969.

== Track listing ==
All songs composed by Bert Jansch except where noted.

1. "Come Sing Me a Happy Song to Prove We All Can Get Along the Lumpy, Bumpy, Long and Dusty Road" – 2:05
2. "The Bright New Year" – 1:34
3. "Tree Song" – 2:37
4. "Poison" – 3:16
5. "Miss Heather Rosemary Sewell" – 2:10
6. "I've Got a Woman" – 5:15
7. "A Woman Like You" – 4:27
8. "I Am Lonely" – 2:31
9. "Promised Land" – 2:51
10. "Birthday Blues" – 1:14
11. "Wishing Well" (Jansch, Anne Briggs) – 2:17
12. "Blues" – 2:40

== Personnel ==
- Bert Jansch - vocals, guitars
- Danny Thompson - bass
- Terry Cox - drums
- Ray Warleigh - alto saxophone, flute
- Duffy Power - harmonica

Technical

- Damon Lyon-Shaw - engineer
- Hans Feurer - cover photography
- Heather Jansch - cover design
- Gordon House - graphics
