= Edge of a Dream =

Studio album by Bert Jansch
- Released: 8 October 2002
- Recorded: 2002 at Bert Jansch's home studio
- Genre: Folk
- Length: 40:49
- Label: Sanctuary
- Producer: Bert Jansch

Bert Jansch chronology
| Downunder: Live In Australia (2001) | Edge of a Dream (2002) | The Black Swan (2006) |

Professional ratings
Review scores
| Source | Rating |
|---|---|
| Allmusic | 3/5 stars |

Edge of a Dream is the 22nd album by Scottish folk musician Bert Jansch, released on 8 October 2002.

The title track is given a rock treatment, and two tracks are baroque instrumentals. The remaining songs are roughly equally divided between bluesy numbers and folky ones. The album features Bernard Butler (of Suede) on electric guitar, and Adam Jansch (Bert's son). "Gypsy Dave" is not the well-known folksong, but an instrumental duo with Dave Swarbrick, dedicated to him. Hope Sandoval (of Mazzy Star) sings the lead on "All This Remains", and Loren Jansch takes the lead on "The Quiet Joys of Brotherhood". "Bright Sunny Morning" is a solemn description of the fall of the World Trade Center.

== Track listing ==
All tracks composed by Bert Jansch; except where indicated

1. "On the Edge of a Dream" - 2:35
2. "All This Remains" (Jansch, Hope Sandoval) - 4:43
3. "What is On Your Mind" - 3:26
4. "Sweet Death" - 3:52
5. "I Cannot Keep From Crying" (Traditional) - 4:06
6. "La Luna" (Johnny "Guitar" Hodge) - 3:15
7. "Gypsy Dave" - 2:43
8. "Walking This Road" - 3:16
9. "The Quiet Joys of Brotherhood" (Richard Fariña, traditional) - 5:31
10. "Black Cat Blues" - 3:07
11. "Bright Sunny Morning" - 4:08

== Personnel ==
- Bert Jansch – vocal, acoustic guitar, electric guitar, bass guitar
- Bernard Butler – electric guitar on 1 and 5, keyboards on 8
- Adam Jansch – bass guitar on 1 and 9
- Makoto Sakamoto – drums on 1 and 3
- Hope Sandoval – vocals on 2
- Colm Ó Cíosóig – drums on 2
- Dave Swarbrick – violin on 4 and 7
- Johnny "Guitar" Hodge – Spanish guitar on 5
- Loren Jansch – vocals on 9
- Paul Wassif – slide guitar on 10
- Ralph McTell – harmonica on 11
