= Sovay =

Traditional song

Sovay is a traditional English folk song (Roud 7, Laws N21) about a young woman named Sovay who dresses and arms herself as a highwayman in order to test her suitor. In disguise she robs her suitor of nearly all his possessions, but even under threat of death he refuses to give up the gold ring given by Sovay, thus proving his devotion. Sovay subsequently confesses the ruse to her lover and returns his various possessions, admonishing him only that had he indeed given up the ring, she would have killed him. The name 'Sovay' is probably a corruption of 'Sophie' or 'Sylvie' – both of which appear instead in some versions of the song.

== History ==
The Bodleian Library has a printed version called "Sylvia's Request and William's Denial" dated to 1877.

Sabine Baring-Gould collected a song called "Lady Turned Highwayman" ("Saucy Sally on one day") in Devon in 1890.

In 1903 Cecil Sharp collected a version which he published in "Folk Songs From Somerset" (1905).

In it he tells the semi-fictional tale of Katherine Ferrers, a possible Lady turned highwayman. This presents a speculative source for a song to be written at about that time.

== Recordings ==
- Cyril Tawney recorded Timothy Walsh singing "Sylvia" in 1960.

It appeared on the album "Fair Game and Foul: The Folk Songs of Britain vol 7" in 1970.

- A. L. Lloyd recorded it as "Sovay the Female Highwayman" on "Bold sportsmen All" in 1962.

Versions of the song have been recorded by:

- Bert Jansch
- Anne Briggs
- Martin Carthy
- Pentangle
- Ruth Barrett and Cyntia Smith
- Jah Wobble
- Keeper's Gate Band
- Cristina Crawley and Kerstein Blodig
- James Yorkston
- Bella Hardy
- Rasputina
- Oli Steadman on his song collection "365 Days Of Folk"
- The Kipper Family
- Méav Ní Mhaolchatha
- Bird in the Belly
- Low Lily

Andrew Bird's original song Sovay takes its title from the folk song and quotes its opening lines in its chorus.

== Adaptations in other media ==
In the mid-80s, the song was used as the theme to Isla St Clair's factual children's TV programme The Song and the Story, which examined the tales behind popular folk songs.

In 1993, Charles Vess and Charles de Lint created a short comic book adaptation of the song, originally published in Dark Horse Presents #75. It was reprinted in The Book of Ballads and Sagas #2 in 1995, which in turn was collected in Ballads in 1997.

In 2008, Celia Rees published Sovay, a young adult novel which follows a young lady during the time of the French Revolution. She initially becomes a highwayman to test the depth of her fiance's love for her, then to save her father and finally because she enjoys the power and freedom provided by her male attire.

The first vocal track—after a brief instrumental intro track—on Andrew Bird's 2005 album, Andrew Bird & the Mysterious Production of Eggs, is entitled 'Sovay'. The song uses an adapted form of the original's main melody, but Bird's lyric has little-to-no relation, appearing to be a rhapsody on the spiritual fight against socio-political backsliding.

The character of Sovay is also referenced in the title song of Talis Kimberley's album Archetype Cafe.

The Kate Bush song "Babooshka" in which a wife disguises herself to test her husband's loyalty was inspired by the story of Sovay.
