= Basket of Light =

Studio album by Pentangle
- Released: October 1969
- Recorded: IBC Studios, London
- Genre: Folk jazz, folk rock
- Length: 40:07
- Label: Transatlantic
- Producer: Shel Talmy

Pentangle chronology
Sweet Child (1968)	Basket of Light (1969)	Cruel Sister (1970)

Professional ratings
Review scores
Source	Rating
Allmusic	4.5/5 stars
Rolling Stone	(unfavorable)

Basket of Light is a 1969 album by the British folk rock group Pentangle. It reached no. 5 on the UK Albums Chart. The single "Light Flight", the theme from BBC1's first colour drama series Take Three Girls, reached no. 43 on the UK singles chart. Another single, "Once I Had a Sweetheart", reached no. 46.

The liner notes state that "Springtime Promises" was written "after a ride on a number 74 bus from Gloucester Road to Greencroft Gardens on an early spring day".

== Legacy ==
The album was included in the books 1001 Albums You Must Hear Before You Die and 1,000 Recordings to Hear Before You Die.

== Tracks ==
All tracks are written by Bert Jansch, John Renbourn, Danny Thompson, Terry Cox and Jacqui McShee, except as noted.

Side one
No.	Title	Writer(s)	Lead vocals	Length
1.	"Light Flight"		McShee	3:14
2.	"Once I Had a Sweetheart"	Traditional, arranged Jansch, Renbourn, Thompson, Cox, McShee	McShee	4:37
3.	"Springtime Promises"		Jansch	4:04
4.	"Lyke-Wake Dirge"	Traditional, arranged Jansch, Renbourn, Thompson, Cox, McShee	Renbourn, Cox and McShee	3:32
5.	"Train Song"		Jansch and McShee	4:43

Side two
No.	Title	Writer(s)	Lead vocals	Length
1.	"Hunting Song"		McShee and Jansch	6:41
2.	"Sally Go 'Round the Roses"	Lona Stevens, Zell Sanders	Renbourn and McShee	3:34
3.	"The Cuckoo"	Traditional, arranged Jansch, Renbourn, Thompson, Cox, McShee	McShee	4:26
4.	"House Carpenter"	Traditional, arranged Jansch, Renbourn, Thompson, Cox, McShee	McShee and Jansch	5:27

The album cover uses photographs of Pentangle's 1968 concert in the Royal Albert Hall. A note about the instrumentation states that "All the instruments played on this album are acoustic."

== Personnel ==
Pentangle

- Terry Cox – drums, glockenspiel, hand drum, vocals
- Bert Jansch – vocals, guitar; banjo on "House Carpenter"
- Jacqui McShee – vocals
- John Renbourn – vocals, guitar, sitar
- Danny Thompson – double bass

Technical

- Shel Talmy – producer
- Damon Lyon-Shaw – engineer
- John Pantry – engineer

== Released versions ==
Basket of Light was released as a UK LP in October 1969, as Transatlantic TRA2O5. The U.S. version, in the same year was Reprise R56372. The album was re-released as a digitally remastered CD in 2001, as Castle CMRCD207, which includes two alternate takes of "Sally Go 'Round the Roses" and the non-album B-sides: "Cold Mountain" and "I Saw an Angel".
