= It Don't Bother Me =

Studio album by Bert Jansch
- Released: November 11, 1965
- Recorded: c. April 1965
- Studio: Pye Studios, Denmark Street, London
- Genre: Folk
- Label: Transatlantic
- Producer: Nathan Joseph, Bill Leader (uncredited)

Bert Jansch chronology
Bert Jansch (1965)	It Don't Bother Me (1965)	Lucky Thirteen (1966)

Professional ratings
Review scores
Source	Rating
AllMusic	4/5 stars
The Encyclopedia of Popular Music	4/5 stars
Record Mirror	3/5 stars
Uncut	4/5 stars

It Don't Bother Me is the second album by Scottish folk musician Bert Jansch, released in November 1965. The album was produced by Nathan Joseph and Bill Leader, although Leader was left uncredited.

The album features nine songs and two instrumentals composed by Jansch, as well as one by Alex Campbell ("So Long [Been on the Road So Long]"), and the traditional "900 Miles". For this last track, Jansch accompanies himself on the banjo rather than the steel-string acoustic guitar which he uses elsewhere. "My Lover" has Roy Harper playing some additional guitar, while John Renbourn is playing the lead acoustic guitar part. "Lucky Thirteen" is a guitar duet with Renbourn, based on a song written by the latter and apparently recorded during the Bert and John session.

== Track listing ==
All tracks composed by Bert Jansch, except where indicated

Side one
No.	Title	Length
1.	"Oh, My Babe"	3:56
2.	"Ring-A-Ding Bird"	4:39
3.	"Tinker's Blues" (Instrumental)	1:04
4.	"Anti Apartheid"	4:02
5.	"The Wheel" (Instrumental)	1:45
6.	"A Man I'd Rather Be"	2:04
7.	"My Lover"	4:00

Side two
No.	Title	Writer(s)	Length
1.	"It Don't Bother Me"		4:25
2.	"Harvest Your Thoughts of Love"		2:12
3.	"Lucky Thirteen" (Instrumental)	John Renbourn	3:30
4.	"As the Day Grows Longer Now"		3:40
5.	"So Long (Been On the Road So Long)"	Alex Campbell	3:10
6.	"Want My Daddy Now"		1:33
7.	"900 Miles"	Traditional	3:03
