= A Rare Conundrum =

Studio album by Bert Jansch
- Released: May 1977 in UK; possibly late 1976 in Denmark
- Recorded: c. October 1975 − July 1976 at Nova Sound, London and Air Studios, London, plus "Doctor, Doctor" from sessions at CBE, Paris in 1973
- Genre: Folk
- Label: Charisma
- Producers: Rod Clements (except "Doctor Doctor" produced by Danny Thompson; "3 A.M." by Bert Jansch)

Bert Jansch chronology
Santa Barbara Honeymoon (1975)	A Rare Conundrum (1977)	Avocet (1979)

Professional ratings
Review scores
Source	Rating
AllMusic	4/5 stars

A Rare Conundrum is an album by Scottish folk musician Bert Jansch, released in 1977 in the UK. The album was first released by Ex Libris Records in Denmark in late 1976 as Poormouth with an alternative cover and a slightly different track list.

== Track listing Original LP ==
All tracks composed by Bert Jansch; except where indicated

1. "Daybreak"
2. "One to a Hundred"
3. "Pretty Saro" (Traditional; arranged by Bert Jansch)
4. "Doctor, Doctor"
5. "3 A.M."
6. "The Curragh of Kildare" (Traditional; arranged by Bert Jansch)
7. "Instrumentally Irish" (Traditional; arranged by Bert Jansch and Rod Clements)
8. "St. Fiacre"
9. "If You See My Love"
10. "Looking for a Home"
11. "Poor Mouth"
12. "Cat and Mouse"
13. "Three Chord Trick"
14. "Lost Love"

=== Poormouth track list (Danish release) ===
Tracks with a star(*) don't appear on the original LP release

1. "Poor Mouth"
2. "St. Fiacre Revenge"
3. "Dragonfly" (John Bidwell) (*)
4. "Pretty Saro"
5. "Doctor, Doctor"
6. "Lost Love"
7. "Candy Man" (Traditional; arranged by Bert Jansch) (*)
8. "Daybreak"
9. "One to a Hundred"
10. "Three Dreamers" (*)
11. "Per's Hose Pipe" (re-titled "Instrumentally Irish") (Traditional; arranged by Bert Jansch and Rod Clements)
12. "The Curragh Of Kildare" (Traditional; arranged by Bert Jansch)
13. "If You See My Love"
14. "Three Chord Trick"

=== 2009 Remaster ===
Same as the original LP release, with the following bonus tracks:

1. "Three Dreamers"
2. "Dragonfly" (John Bidwell)
3. "Candyman" (Traditional; arranged by Bert Jansch)

== Personnel ==
- Bert Jansch – vocals, guitars
- Rod Clements – bass, mandolin, guitar, vocals
- Ralph McTell – harmonica
- 'Mantha – backing vocals on "Three Card Trick"
- Mike Piggott – violin
- Pick Withers – drums, percussion
- Dave Bainbridge – Fender Rhodes on "If You See My Love"; backing vocals on "Three Card Trick"

Technical

- Peter Henderson, Colin Fairley, Jean-Louis Proust, Lindsay Kidd, Aldo Bocca – engineer
- Mike Hedges – tape op
- Frank Sansom – art direction
- Nick Hockley – illustration
