= Rosemary Lane (album) =

Studio album by Bert Jansch
- Released: June 1971
- Recorded: June 1970 – January 1971 at Ticehurst, Sussex
- Genre: Folk
- Length: 37:22
- Label: Transatlantic
- Producer: Bill Leader

Bert Jansch chronology
Birthday Blues (1969)	Rosemary Lane (1971)	Moonshine (1973)

Professional ratings
Review scores
Source	Rating
AllMusic	3/5 stars
Uncut	3/5 stars

Rosemary Lane is the seventh album by contemporary British folk musician Bert Jansch, released in 1971. The sleeve was designed by Heather Jansch.

== Track listing ==
Side one
No.	Title	Writer(s)	Length
1.	"Tell Me What Is True Love?"	Bert Jansch	2:02
2.	"Rosemary Lane"	Traditional; arranged by Jansch	4:04
3.	"M'Lady Nancy" (Instrumental)	Jansch	2:34
4.	"A Dream, A Dream, A Dream"	Jansch	2:43
5.	"Alman" (Instrumental)	Robert Johnson	1:23
6.	"Wayward Child"	Jansch	2:07
7.	"Nobody's Bar"	Jansch	3:03

Side two
No.	Title	Writer(s)	Length
1.	"Reynardine"	Traditional; arranged by Jansch	5:22
2.	"Silly Woman"	Jansch	3:16
3.	"Peregrinations" (Instrumental)	Jansch	1:49
4.	"Sylvie"	Traditional, arranged by Jansch	4:30
5.	"Sarabanda" (Instrumental)	Arcangelo Corelli	1:32
6.	"Bird Song"	Jansch	2:56
