= Bert and John =

Studio album by Bert Jansch
- Released: September 1966
- Recorded: c. early summer 1966
- Studio: 23 St. Edmunds Terrace, St. John’s Wood, London
- Genre: Folk
- Label: Transatlantic
- Producer: Bill Leader

Bert Jansch chronology
Jack Orion (1966)	Bert and John (1966)	Nicola (1967)

Professional ratings
Review scores
Source	Rating
AllMusic	3/5 stars
The Encyclopedia of Popular Music	4/5 stars

Bert and John is an album by the folk musicians Bert Jansch and John Renbourn, released in 1966. The two would later play together in the group Pentangle. An expanded version of the album was later released in America in 1969 by Vanguard as Stepping Stones. It featured two extra tracks, "It Don't Bother Me" and "My Lover".

== Track listing ==
All tracks credited to Bert Jansch and John Renbourn, except where specified.

Side one
No.	Title	Writer(s)	Length
1.	"East Wind"		1:25
2.	"Piano Tune"		1:39
3.	"Goodbye Pork Pie Hat"	Charles Mingus	3:51
4.	"Soho"	Jansch	3:00
5.	"Tic-Tocative"		1:56
6.	"Orlando"		1:40

Side two
No.	Title	Writer(s)	Length
7.	"Red's Favourite"		1:33
8.	"No Exit"		1:24
9.	"Along the Way"	Renbourn	2:02
10.	"The Time Has Come"	Anne Briggs	2:53
11.	"Stepping Stones"		2:42
12.	"After the Dance"		2:23

1969 Vanguard US release
No.	Title	Writer(s)	Length
1.	"East Wind"		1:22
2.	"Piano Tune"		1:27
3.	"Goodbye Pork Pie Hat"	Mingus	3:49
4.	"Soho"	Jansch	2:59
5.	"Tic-Tocative"		1:55
6.	"Orlando"		1:37
7.	"My Lover"	Jansch
8.	"Stepping Stones"		2:41
9.	"Red's Favourite"		1:31
10.	"It Don't Bother Me"	Jansch	4:25
11.	"No Exit"		1:22
12.	"Along the Way"	Renbourn	2:02
13.	"The Time Has Come"	Briggs	2:52
14.	"After the Dance"		2:25
