= L.A. Turnaround =

Studio album by Bert Jansch
- Released: September 1974
- Recorded: c. April–June 1974 at Luxford House, Crowborough, Sussex and Sound City, Sepulveda, California; plus two tracks c. early 1973 from CBE Studios, Paris
- Genre: Folk rock, country rock
- Length: 49:21 (reissue)
- Label: Charisma
- Producer: Mike Nesmith; Danny Thompson on "Chambertin" and "Lady Nothing"

Bert Jansch chronology
| Moonshine (1973) | L.A. Turnaround (1974) | Santa Barbara Honeymoon (1975) |

L.A. Turnaround is the ninth album by Scottish folk musician Bert Jansch, released in 1974.

== Background ==
After the demise of Pentangle, Jansch recorded the album in Tony Stratton Smith's home in Crowborough, Sussex and in a studio in California. It was produced by Michael Nesmith with the exception of two of the tracks ("Chambertin" and former bandmate John Renbourn’s "Lady Nothing") which were recorded in Paris a year earlier. A short film was produced during the sessions in Sussex.

Other guest musicians include Klaus Voormann (bass guitar), Red Rhodes (pedal steel guitar), Byron Berline (fiddle, mandolin) and Jesse Ed Davis (guitar).

== Reception ==
Professional ratings
Review scores
| Source | Rating |
|---|---|
| Allmusic | 4/5 stars |

In his review for Allmusic, critic Thom Jurek wrote of the album, "The album was hailed at the time as an exemplary work, and its reputation certainly holds in the 21st century... the set walks through a lush garden that stands between the traditional English folk that Jansch had mastered and a sort of easy-breathing country-rock. Simply put, this is one of Jansch’s masterpieces, and a singular type of album in his long and storied career."

== Track listing ==
All tracks composed by Bert Jansch, except where indicated.

Side one

1. "Fresh as a Sweet Sunday Morning" – 3:57
2. "Chambertin" – 4:04
3. "One for Jo" – 2:28
4. "Travelling Man" – 2:47
5. "Open Up the Watergate (Let the Sunshine In)" – 2:40
6. "Stone Monkey" – 3:10

Side two

1. "Of Love and Lullaby" – 2:28
2. "Needle of Death" – 3:24
3. "Lady Nothing" (John Renbourn) – 2:32
4. "There Comes a Time" – 2:38
5. "Cluck Old Hen" (Traditional; arranged by Bert Jansch) – 3:10
6. "The Blacksmith" (lyrics: Jansch; music: Doc Watson) – 3:30

Bonus tracks (2009 reissue):

13. "Open Up the Watergate" (Alternate Version) – 3:38
14. "One for Jo" (Alternate Version) – 3:10
15. "The Blacksmith" (Alternate Version) – 3:39
16. "In the Bleak Midwinter" (Christina Rossetti, Gustav Holst; arranged by Bert Jansch) – 2:25

== Personnel ==
- Bert Jansch - guitar, piano, vocals
- Michael Nesmith - guitar
- Red Rhodes - steel guitar
- Byron Berline - fiddle, mandolin on "Cluck Old Hen"
- Klaus Voormann - bass
- Danny Lane - drums
- Jesse Ed Davis - guitar on "Open Up the Watergate"
- Jay Lacy - guitar on "Of Love and Lullaby"
- Michael Cohen - electric piano on "The Blacksmith"

== Production ==
- Producer: Michael Nesmith, Danny Thompson
- Recording engineer: Jean-Louis, Ron Nevison, Bill Drescher
- Art Direction: Frank Sansom
- Photography: Mike Van Der Vord
