= Bert Jansch (album) =

Studio album by Bert Jansch
- Released: 16 April 1965
- Recorded: September 1964 – January 1965
- Studio: 5 North Villas, Camden, London
- Genre: Folk
- Length: 39:19
- Label: Transatlantic
- Producer: Bill Leader

Bert Jansch chronology
Bert Jansch (1965)	It Don't Bother Me (1965)

Professional ratings
Review scores
Source	Rating
AllMusic	4.5/5 stars
The Encyclopedia of Popular Music	5/5 stars
Uncut	4/5 stars

Bert Jansch is the debut album by Scottish folk musician Bert Jansch. The album was recorded on a reel-to-reel tape recorder at engineer Bill Leader's house and sold to Transatlantic Records for £100. Transatlantic released the album, which went on to sell 150,000 copies. The album was included in Robert Dimery's 1001 Albums You Must Hear Before You Die. It was voted number 649 in the third edition of Colin Larkin's All Time Top 1000 Albums (2000).

The record includes Jansch's best-known song, "Needle of Death", which was inspired by the death of his friend, folk singer Buck Polly.

== Track listing ==
All tracks written by Bert Jansch, except where specified.

No.	Title	Writer(s)	Length
1.	"Strolling Down the Highway"		3:06
2.	"Smokey River" (Instrumental)		2:56
3.	"Oh How Your Love Is Strong"		3:40
4.	"I Have No Time"		3:09
5.	"Finches" (Instrumental)		0:51
6.	"Veronica" (Instrumental)		1:32
7.	"Needle of Death"		3:20
8.	"Do You Hear Me Now?"		2:06
9.	"Rambling's Gonna Be the Death of Me"		3:18
10.	"Alice's Wonderland" (Instrumental; inspired by Charles Mingus)		1:46
11.	"Running From Home"		2:24
12.	"Courting Blues"		4:02
13.	"Casbah" (Instrumental)		2:10
14.	"Dreams of Love"		1:44
15.	"Angie" (Instrumental)	Davey Graham	3:15
