= Heather Jansch =

British sculptor (1948–2021)

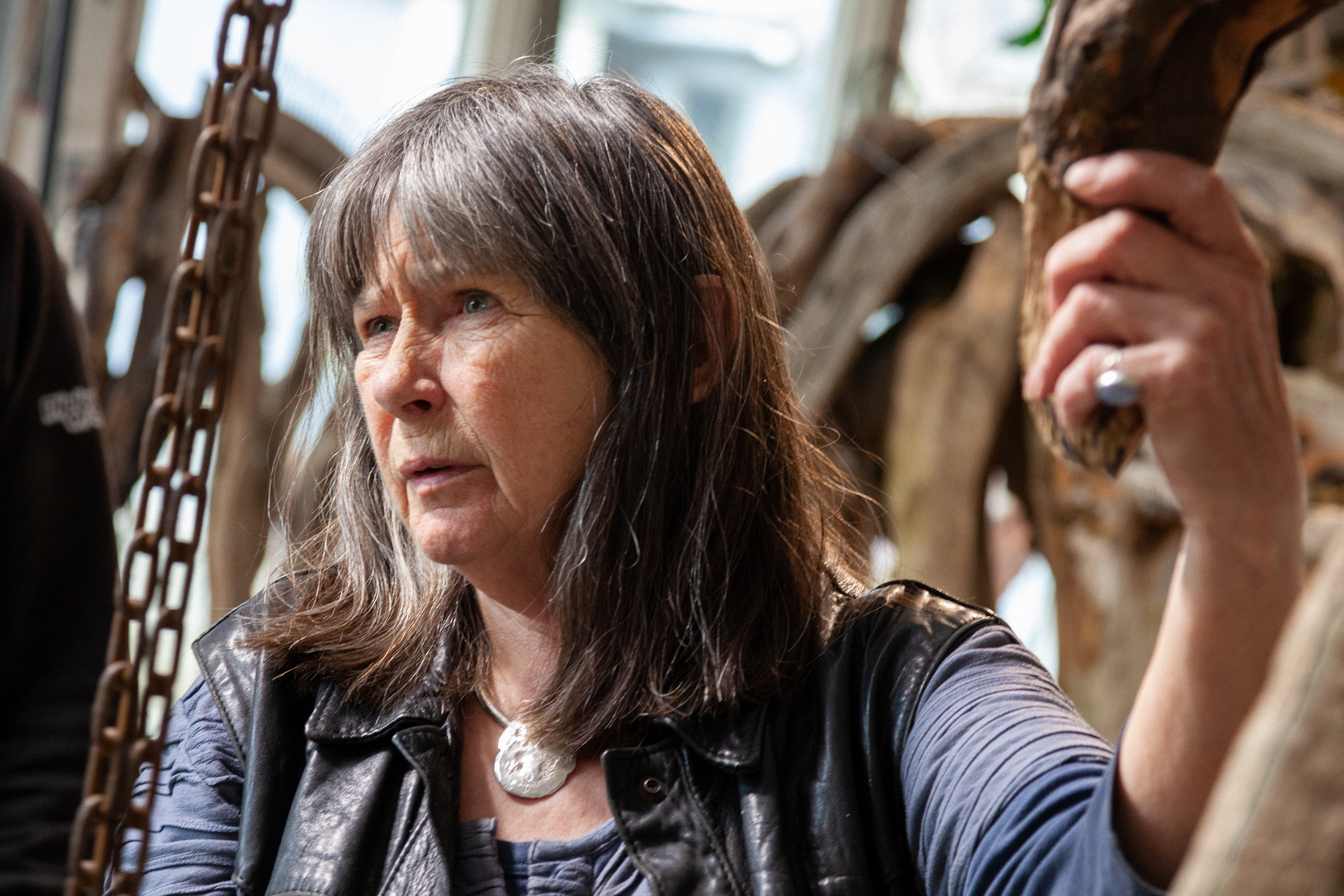
- Jansch at work in her studio in Olchard, Devon
- Born: Heather Rosemary Sewell; August 3, 1948; Hockley, Essex
- Died: 5 July 2021; Olchard, Devon
- Education: Walthamstow Technical College and Goldsmiths College
- Occupation: Sculptor
- Years active: 1968–2021
- Notable work: Driftwood horses
- Spouse: Bert Jansch (divorced)
- Children: Kieron Jansch
- Website: www.heatherjansch.com

Heather Jansch (born Heather Rosemary Sewell) was a British sculptor notable for making life-sized sculptures of horses from driftwood. Jansch reported that she struggled in her youth academically, but had a passion for drawing and writing. She attended Walthamstow Technical College for her Foundation year and from there gained a place at Goldsmiths, University of London. This proved a great disappointment, as figurative art was greatly derided there at the time. She left after the first year.

While at Walthamstow, in 1967, she had met the musician Roy Harper. It was Harper who introduced her to the already renowned guitarist Bert Jansch, whom she married in 1968. They had a son, Kieron, now a filmmaker, in 1971. They separated in 1974 and divorced some years later.

She bought a small hill farm in Dyfed, breeding Welsh cobs and specialized in painting traditional equestrian portraits until starting to sculpt in the 80s. Discovering driftwood as a medium for sculpture proved revelatory. Heather spent many years perfecting the translation of her complex work into bronze, pioneering a technique that made them indistinguishable from the driftwood original.

By 1986 she was exhibiting sculpture regularly with Courcoux and Courcoux, a leading provincial contemporary gallery then based in Salisbury that took her work to the London Contemporary Art Fair where it received very favourable reviews.

Her life-size driftwood horses became her hallmark and in 1999 were featured in the Shape of the Century 100 Years of Sculpture in Britain at Salisbury Cathedral. The exhibition was then taken to London's Canary Wharf as part of the millennium celebrations in 2000 where her horses caught the attention of Tim Smit, founder of the Eden Project; she was invited to become one of their resident artists. Her horse was voted the most popular art work there and has since become widely known as The Eden Horse.

There are pieces by Heather Jansch in private collections around the world including in the US, Canada, Switzerland, France and Romania. She exhibited internationally on a number of occasions, including, in 2007, as artist in residence at Arte Sella in Borgo Valsugana, Italy.

A life-long writer, in 2009 Jansch set up Olchard Press. She published "Heather Jansch's Diary", "Bert Jansch: Living with the Legend" about her life with Bert, and ruminations on her expeditions to Italy, "The Italian Job", released in Summer 2021.

She died, following a stroke, on 5 July 2021 at Olchard, Devon.

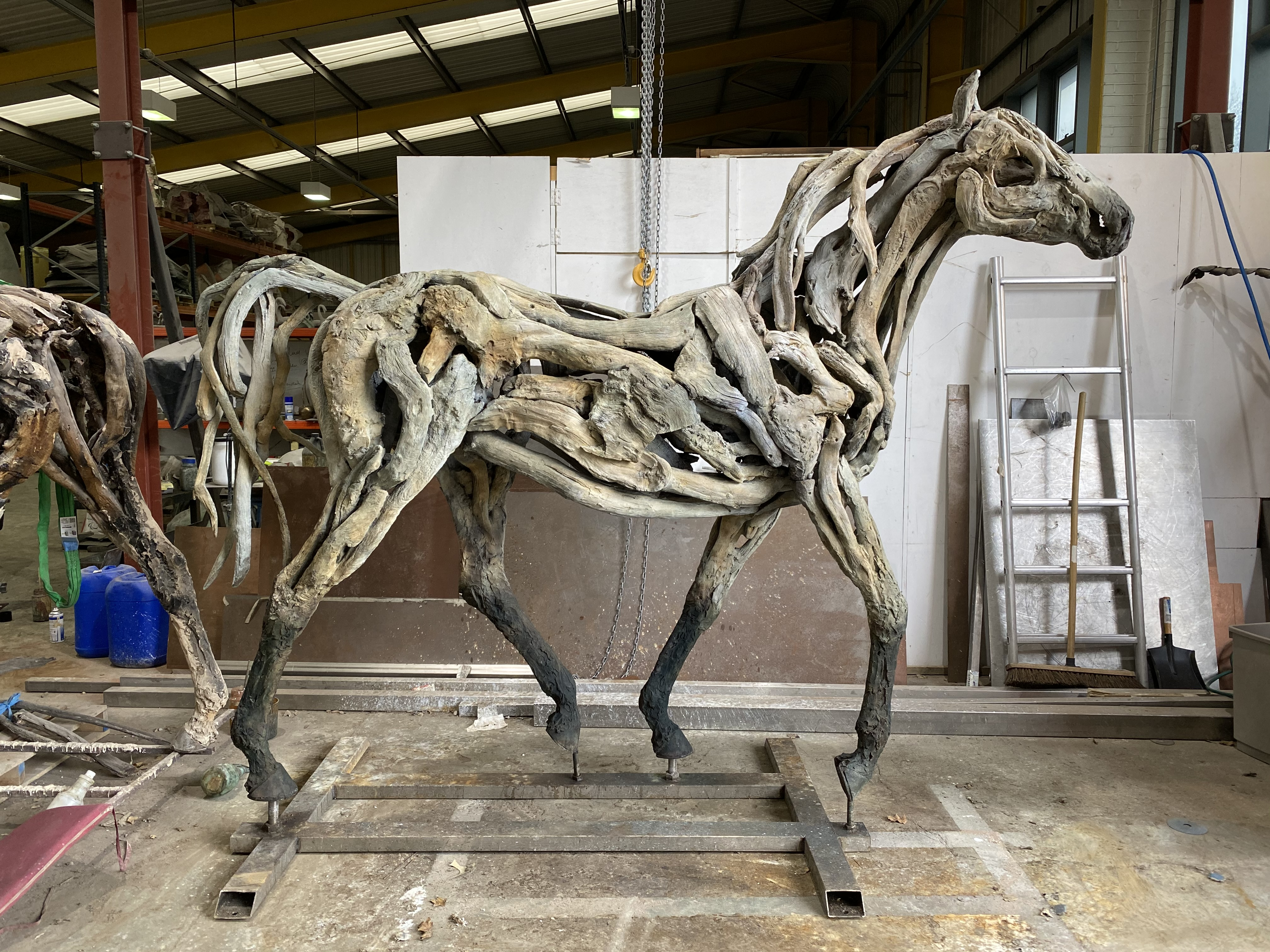
"Apollo" by Heather Jansch. Bronze cast from the driftwood original, shown fresh from construction in the foundry at Basingstoke.

== Picture gallery ==
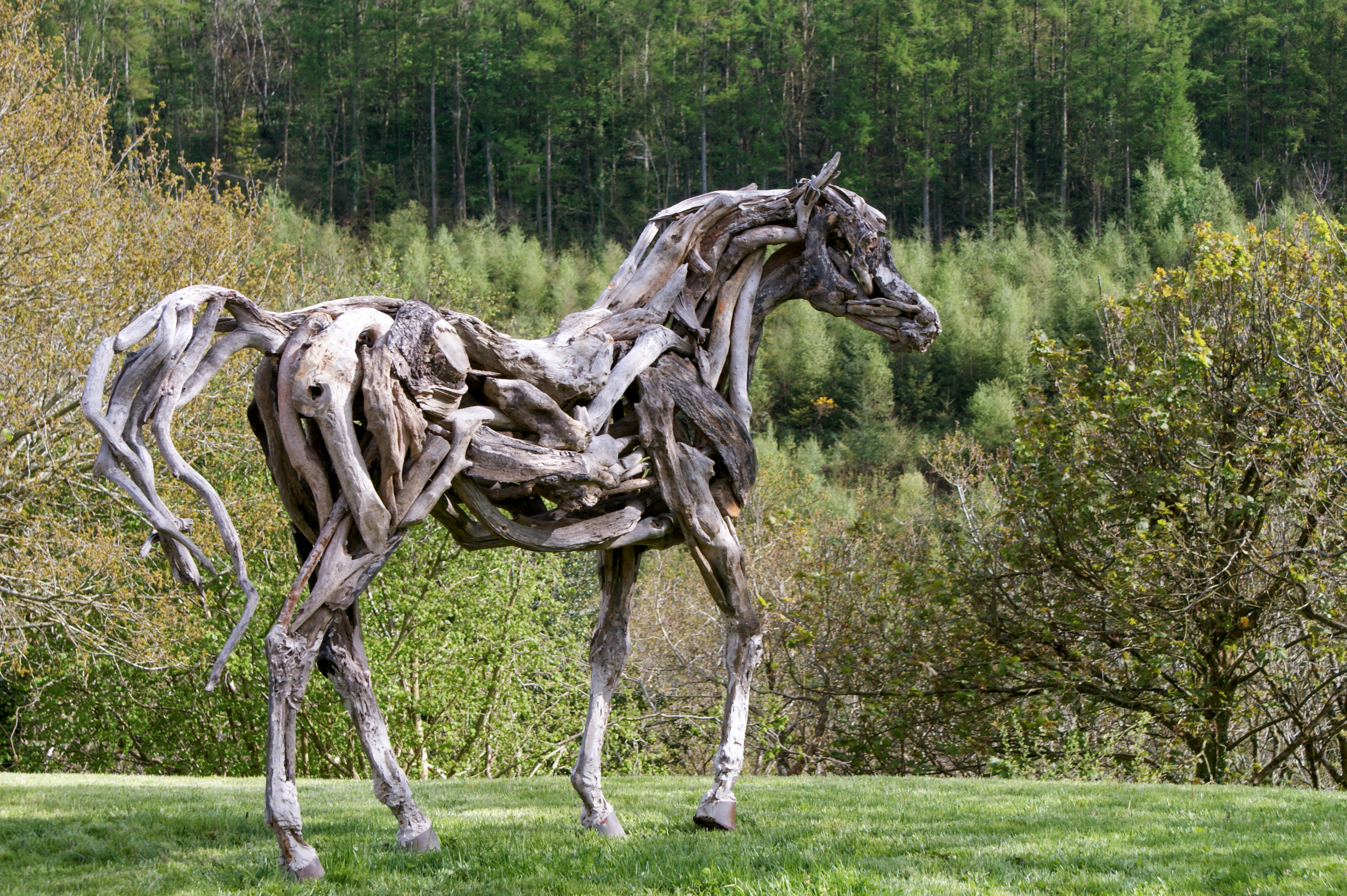
The Eden Horse by Heather Jansch, 2002. On display at Heather's garden in Olchard prior to delivery to The Eden Project.

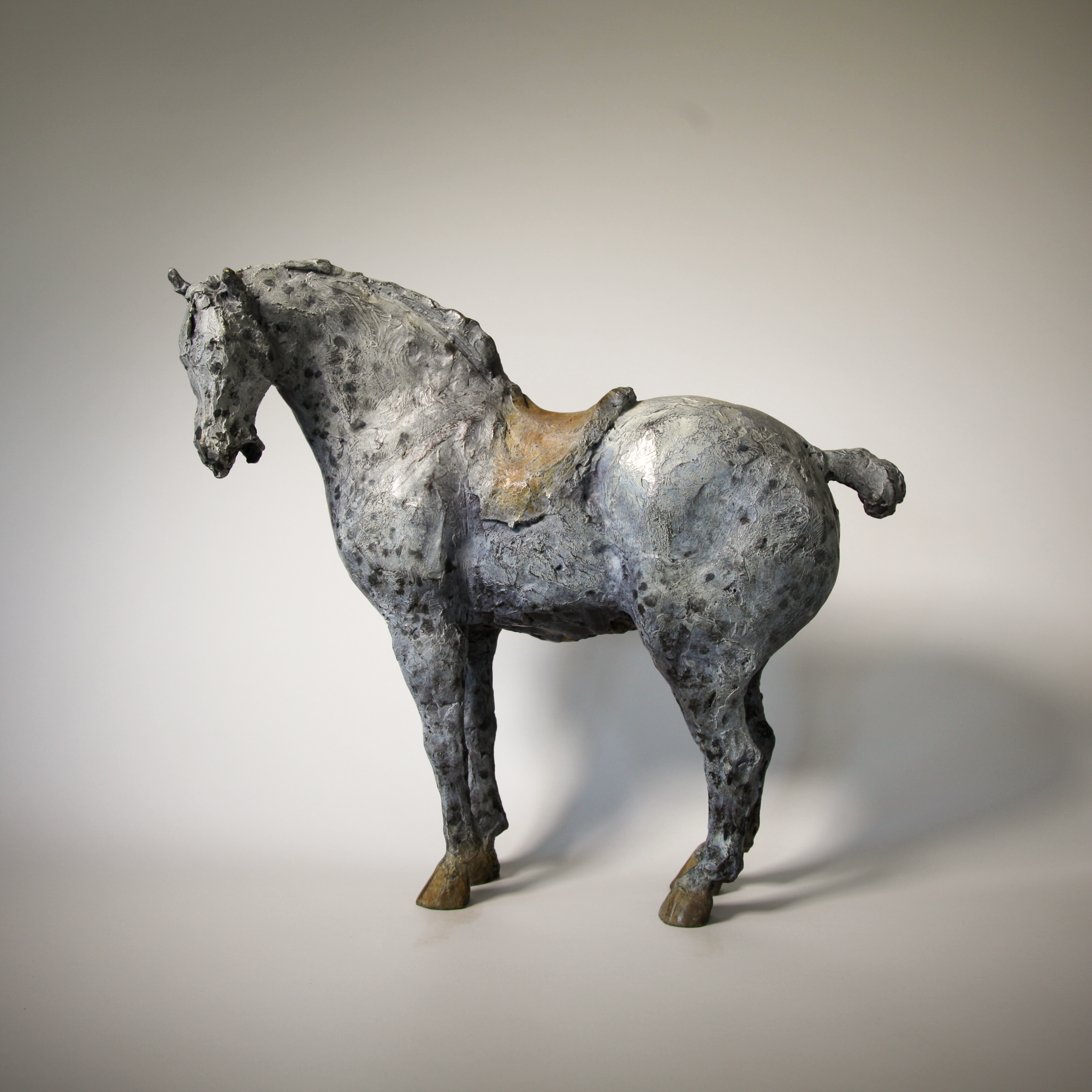
Chinoise by Heather Jansch, 2007. Bronze.

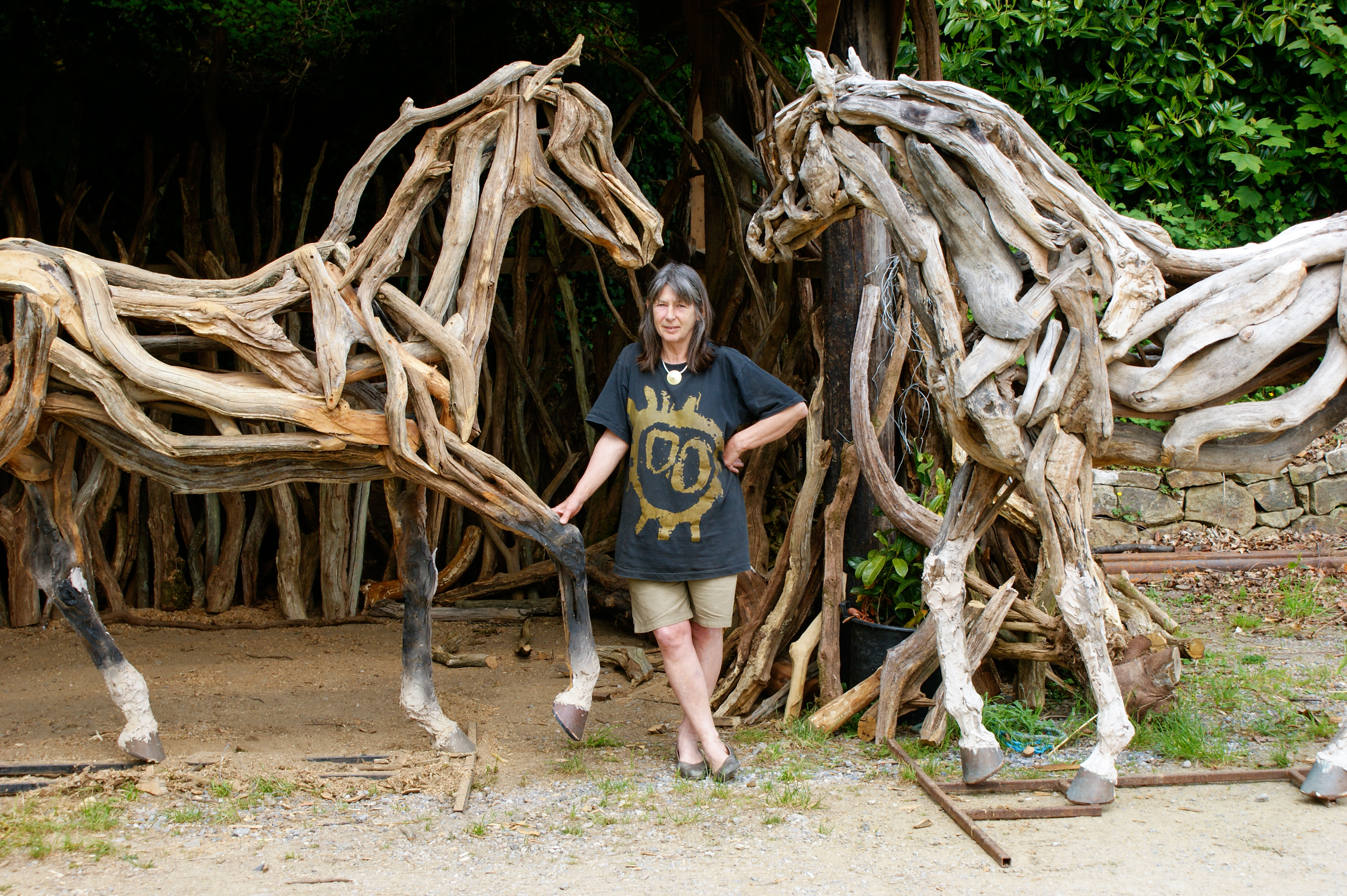
Sculptor Heather Jansch, flanked by two of her life-size horses. "Atlantis" on Heather's right, and "The Eden Horse" on her left.

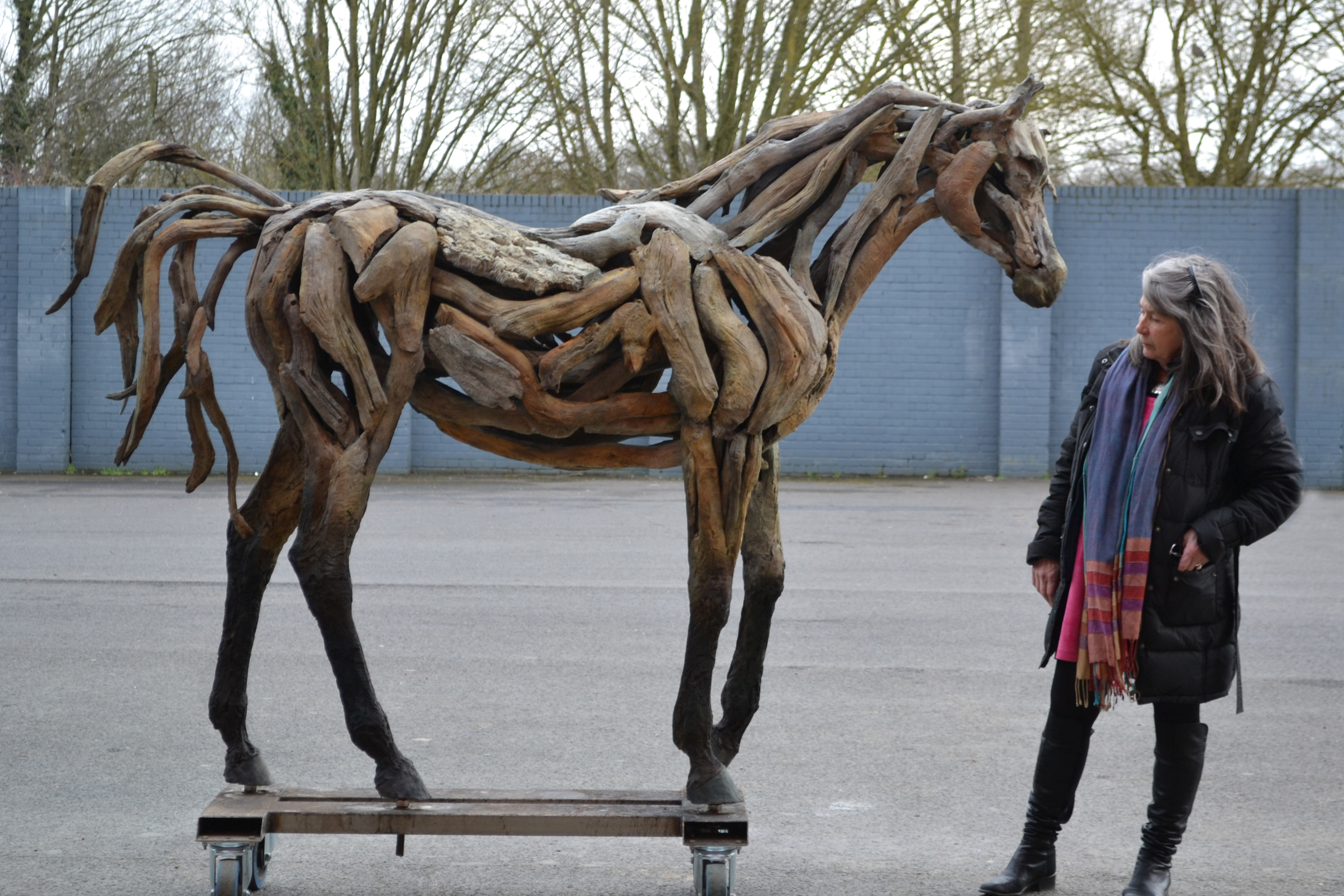
Sculptor Heather Jansch standing next to the latest cast of her work "The Young Arabian"
