= Bert Jansch =

Scottish folk musician (1943–2011)

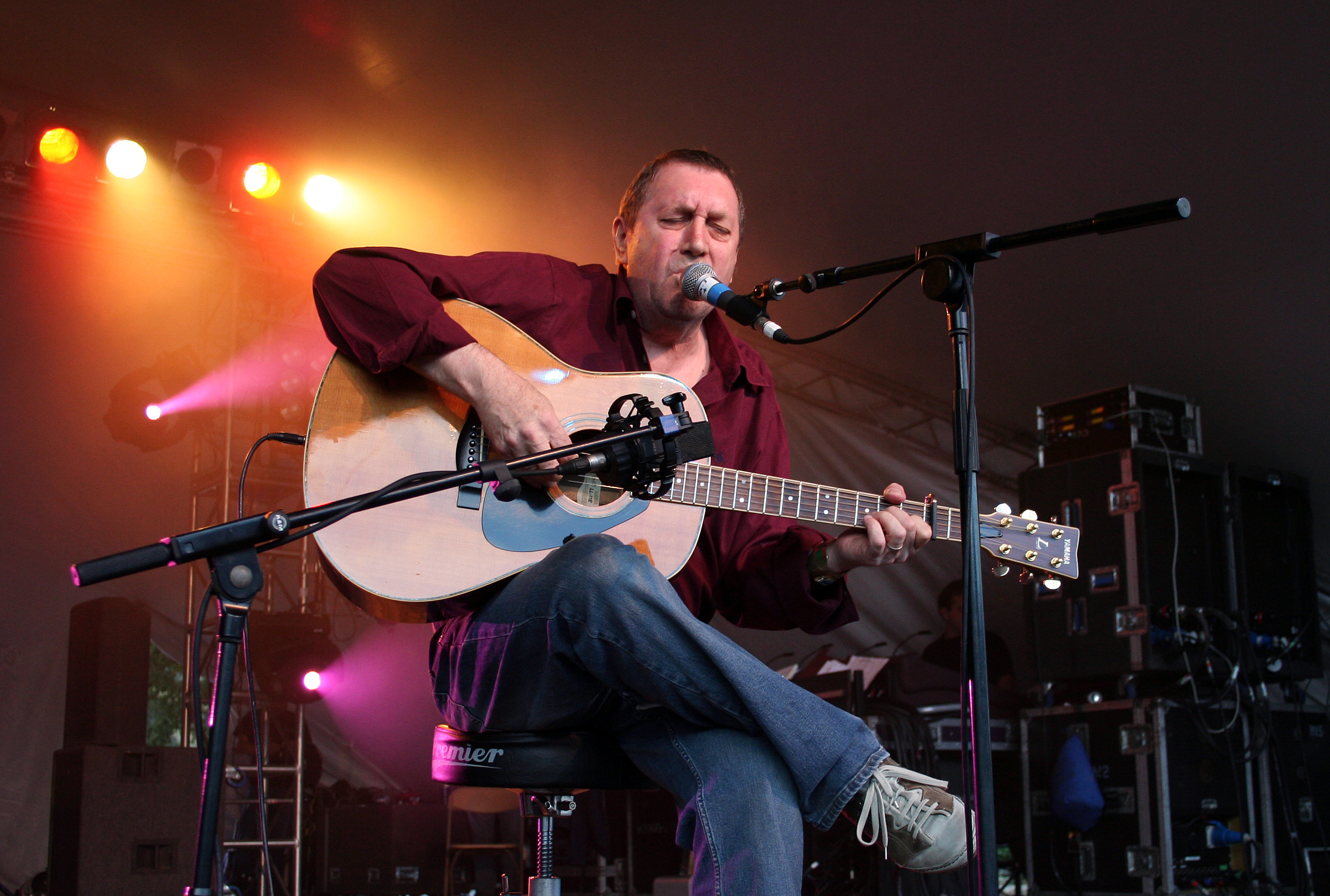
- Jansch performing in August 2006

Background information
- Born: Herbert Jansch; 3 November 1943; Glasgow, Scotland
- Origin: Pilton, Edinburgh, Scotland
- Died: 5 October 2011 (aged 67) Hampstead, London, England
- Genres: Folk, folk rock, folk baroque
- Occupations: Musician, singer-songwriter
- Instruments: Vocals, guitar, banjo, Appalachian dulcimer, concertina, sitar
- Years active: 1965–2011
- Labels: Transatlantic; Charisma; Run River Records
- Formerly of: Pentangle
- Website: www.bertjansch.com

Herbert Jansch (3 November 1943 – 5 October 2011) was a Scottish folk musician and founding member of the band Pentangle. He was born in Glasgow and came to prominence in London in the 1960s as an acoustic guitarist and singer-songwriter. He recorded more than 28 albums and toured extensively from the 1960s to the 21st century.

Jansch was a leading figure in the 1960s British folk revival, touring folk clubs and recording several solo albums, as well as collaborating with other musicians such as John Renbourn and Anne Briggs. In 1968, he co-founded the band Pentangle, touring and recording with them until their break-up in 1972. He then took a few years' break from music, returning in the late 1970s to work on a series of projects with other musicians. He joined a reformed Pentangle in the early 1980s and remained with them as they evolved through various changes of personnel until 1995. Until his death, Jansch continued to work as a solo artist.

Jansch's work influenced a number of artists, especially Jimmy Page, Mike Oldfield, Paul Simon, Pete Hawkes, Nick Drake, Donovan, Neil Young, and Johnny Marr. He received two Lifetime Achievement Awards at the BBC Folk Awards: one, in 2001, for his solo achievements and the other, in 2007, as a member of Pentangle.

== Early years ==
Herbert Jansch was born at Stobhill Hospital in the Springburn district of Glasgow, on 3 November 1943, the descendant of a family originally from Hamburg, Germany, who settled in Scotland during the Victorian era. The family name is pronounced /ˈjænʃ/ yansh in German, although Jansch himself, like several other members of his family, pronounced it /ˈdʒænʃ/ jansh.

Jansch was brought up in the residential area of Edinburgh known as West Pilton, where he attended Pennywell Primary School and Ainslie Park Secondary School. As a teenager, he acquired a guitar and started visiting a local folk club ("The Howff") run by Roy Guest. There, he met Archie Fisher and Jill Doyle (Davey Graham's half-sister), who introduced him to the music of Big Bill Broonzy, Pete Seeger, Brownie McGhee and Woody Guthrie. He also met and shared a flat with Robin Williamson, who remained a friend when Jansch later moved to London.

After leaving school, Jansch took a job as a nurseryman then, in August 1960, he gave this up, intending to become a full-time musician. He appointed himself as an unofficial caretaker at The Howff and, as well as sleeping there, he may have received some pay to supplement his income as a novice performer who did not own his own guitar. He spent the next two years playing one-night stands in British folk clubs. This was a musical apprenticeship that exposed him to a range of influences, including Martin Carthy and Ian Campbell, but especially Anne Briggs, from whom he learned some of the songs (such as "Blackwaterside" and "Reynardine") that would later feature strongly in his recording career.

Jansch travelled around Europe and beyond between 1963 and 1965, hitch-hiking from place to place, living on earnings from busking and casual musical performances in bars and cafes. In Scotland he became involved with Licorice McKechnie, who was a teenager at the time. A marriage was planned and the banns were published, but the wedding never took place. Jansch left her behind to travel to Morocco in 1963, and she took up with Robin Williamson of the Incredible String Band. Before leaving Glasgow, Jansch married a 16-year-old girl, Lynda Campbell. It was a marriage of convenience which allowed her to travel with him, as she was too young to have her own passport. They split up after a few months, and Jansch was eventually repatriated to Britain after catching dysentery in Tangiers.

== London (mid-1960s) ==
Jansch moved to London. There, in 1963, at the invitation of Bob Wilson – a Staffordshire folksinger who was also an art student at St Martin's School of Art – he was asked to take over as resident singer at Bunjies on Litchfield Street with Charles Pearce, another art student. They remained in that situation for a year before Pearce moved to South London to run several clubs south of the Thames. There was a burgeoning interest in folk music throughout London by then. There, he met the engineer and producer Bill Leader, at whose home they made a recording of Jansch's music on a reel-to-reel tape recorder. Leader sold the tape for £100 to Transatlantic Records, who produced an album directly from it. The album Bert Jansch was released in 1965, and went on to sell 150,000 copies. It included Jansch's protest song "Do You Hear Me Now", which was brought to the attention of the pop music mainstream later that year by the singer Donovan, who covered it on his The Universal Soldier EP, which reached No. 1 in the UK EP chart and No. 27 in the singles chart. Pearce disappeared from Jansch's life after arranging for him to be one of the artists in the Liberal International concert, "Master of the Guitar" at the Royal Festival Hall in 1968. Also included on Jansch's first album was his song "Needle of Death", a stark anti-drugs lament written after a friend died of a heroin overdose.

In his early career, Jansch was sometimes characterized as a British Bob Dylan. During this period, Jansch stated that his musical influences were few: "the only three people that I've ever copied were Big Bill Broonzy, Davy Graham and Archie Fisher." Jansch followed his first album with two more, produced in quick succession: It Don't Bother Me and Jack Orion, which contained his first recording of "Blackwaterside", later to be taken up by Jimmy Page and recorded by Led Zeppelin as "Black Mountain Side". Jansch said, "The accompaniment was nicked by a well-known member of one of the most famous rock bands, who used it, unchanged, on one of their records." Transatlantic took legal advice about the alleged copyright infringement, and was advised that there was "a distinct possibility that Bert might win an action against Page." Ultimately, Transatlantic was dubious about the costs involved in taking on Led Zeppelin in the courts, and half the costs would have had to be paid by Jansch personally, which he simply could not afford, so the case was never pursued. The arrangement and recording of Jack Orion was greatly influenced by Jansch's friend, singer Anne Briggs.

In London, Jansch met other innovative acoustic guitar players, including John Renbourn, with whom he shared a flat in Kilburn, Davy Graham, Wizz Jones, Roy Harper and Paul Simon. They would all meet and play in various London music clubs, including the Troubadour in Old Brompton Road, and Les Cousins club in Greek Street, Soho. Renbourn and Jansch frequently played together, developing their own intricate interplay between the two guitars, often referred to as "Folk baroque".

In 1966, they recorded the Bert and John album together, featuring much of this material. Late in 1967, they tired of the all-nighters at Les Cousins and became the resident musicians at a music venue set up by Bruce Dunnet, a Scottish entrepreneur, at the Horseshoe pub (now defunct), at 264–267 Tottenham Court Road. This became the haunt of a number of musicians, including the singer Sandy Denny. Another singer, Jacqui McShee, began performing with the two guitarists and, with the addition of Danny Thompson (string bass) and Terry Cox (drums), they formed the group Pentangle. The venue evolved into a jazz club, but by then the group had moved on.

On 19 October 1968, Jansch married Heather Sewell. At the time, she was an art student and had been the girlfriend of Roy Harper. She inspired several of Jansch's songs and instrumentals, the most obvious being "Miss Heather Rosemary Sewell" from his 1968 album Birthday Blues, but Jansch says that, despite the name, "M'Lady Nancy" from the 1971 Rosemary Lane album was also written for her. As Heather Jansch, she became known for her sculptures.

== Pentangle years: 1968–73 ==
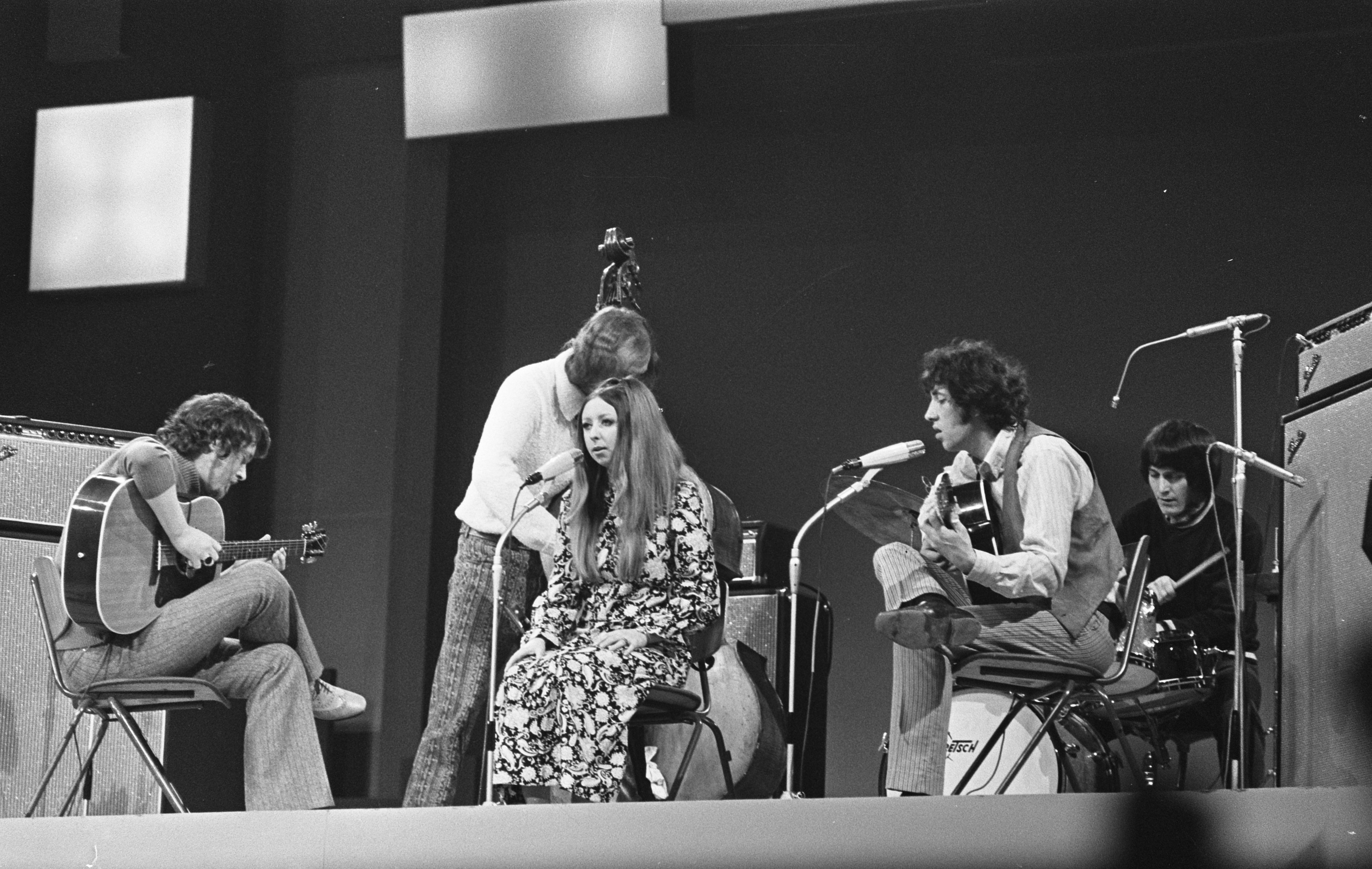
Jansch (right front) playing with Pentangle in Amsterdam, 1969

Pentangle's first major concert was at the Royal Festival Hall in 1967, and their first album, The Pentangle, was released in the following year. Pentangle embarked on a demanding schedule of touring the world and recording and, during this period, Jansch largely gave up solo performances. He did, however, continue to record, releasing Rosemary Lane in 1971. The tracks for this album were recorded on a portable tape recorder by Bill Leader at Jansch's cottage in Ticehurst, Sussex—a process which took several months, with Jansch only working when he was in the right mood.

Pentangle reached their highest point of commercial success with the release of their Basket of Light album in 1969. The single "Light Flight", taken from the album, became popular through its use as theme music for a TV drama series, Take Three Girls, for which the band also provided incidental music. In 1970, at the peak of their popularity, they recorded a soundtrack for the film Tam Lin, made at least 12 television appearances, and undertook tours of the UK (including the Isle of Wight Festival) and America (including a concert at Carnegie Hall). However, their fourth album, Cruel Sister, released in October 1970, was a commercial disaster. This was an album of traditional songs that included a 20-minute-long version of "Jack Orion", a song that Jansch and Renbourn had recorded previously as a duo on Jansch's Jack Orion album.

Pentangle recorded two further albums, but the strains of touring and of working together as a band were taking their toll. Then Pentangle withdrew from their record company, Transatlantic, in a bitter dispute regarding royalties. The final album of the original incarnation of Pentangle was Solomon's Seal released by Warner Brothers/Reprise in 1972. Colin Harper, author of a 2000 biography of Jansch, describes it as "a record of people's weariness, but also the product of a unit whose members were still among the best players, writers and musical interpreters of their day." Pentangle split up in January 1973, and Jansch and his wife bought a farm near Lampeter, in Wales, and withdrew temporarily from the concert circuit.

== Mid 1970s ==
Jansch spent two or three years in California in the mid-1970s. He recorded most of his 1974 album LA Turnaround and 1975 album Santa Barbara Honeymoon while there. The making of LA Turnaround was documented in a film produced by Mike Nesmith.

== Late 1970s ==
After two years as a farmer, Jansch left his wife and family and returned to music, although Jansch and his wife would not be formally divorced until 1988. In 1977, he recorded the album A Rare Conundrum with a new set of musicians: Mike Piggott, Rod Clements and Pick Withers. He then formed the band Conundrum with the addition of Martin Jenkins (violin) and Nigel Smith (bass). They spent six months touring Australia, Japan and the United States. With the end of the tour, Conundrum parted company and Jansch spent six months in the United States, where he recorded the Heartbreak album with Albert Lee.

Jansch toured Scandinavia, working as a duo with Martin Jenkins and, based on ideas they developed, recorded the Avocet album (initially released in Denmark). Jansch rated this as among his own favourites from his own recordings. On returning to England, he set up Bert Jansch's Guitar Shop at 220, New King's Road, Fulham. The shop specialised in hand-built acoustic guitars but was not a commercial success and closed after two years.

== 1980s ==
In 1980, an Italian promoter encouraged the original Pentangle to reform for a tour and a new album. The reunion started badly, with Terry Cox being injured in a car accident, resulting in the band's debuting at the Cambridge Folk Festival as a four-piece Pentangle. They managed to complete a tour of Italy (with Cox in a wheelchair) and Australia, before Renbourn left the band in 1983. There then followed a series of personnel changes, including Mike Piggott replacing John Renbourn from 1983 to 1987 and recording Open the Door and In the Round, but ultimately leaving Jansch and McShee as the only original members. The final incarnation consisting of Jansch, McShee, Nigel Portman Smith (keyboards), Peter Kirtley (guitar and vocals) and Gerry Conway (drums) survived from 1987 to 1995 and recorded three albums: Think of Tomorrow, One More Road and Live 1994.

In 1985, two limited edition albums appeared, issued under the name of Loren Auerbach, who was to become Jansch's wife: After the Long Night was released in February 1985, the second, Playing the Game, appearing in October. Jansch was initially a guest player, but also became a writer on some of the songs, as well as an arranger and co-vocalist. Richard Newman was the primary guitarist and songwriter. Auerbach had worked alongside Newman for a number of years before meeting Jansch. Newman and Jansch were the key players on After the Long Night. On Playing the Game, Jansch and Newman joined Cliff Aungier, Geoff Bradford (lead guitarist from Cyril Davis' All Stars, from Long John Baldry's Hoochie Coochie Men, and in the first line-up of The Rolling Stones) and Brian Knight (British blues veteran of the Blues By Six). The two albums became one—After The Long Night / Playing The Game. Jansch played guitar with Richard Newman on the following Newman songs: "I Can't Go Back", "Smiling Faces", "Playing the Game", "Sorrow", "Days and Nights", "The Rainbow Man", "Frozen Beauty", "Christabel", "So Lonely" and "The Miller". All songs were sung by Auerbach with the exception of "The Miller", which was sung by Newman. Jansch married Auerbach in 1999.

He had always been a heavy drinker, but in 1987 Jansch fell ill while working with Rod Clements and Marty Craggs, and was rushed to hospital, where he was told that he was "as seriously ill as you can be without dying" and that he had a choice of "giving up alcohol or simply giving up." He chose the former option, for which Colin Harper, author of a 2000 biography of Jansch, writes: "There can be no doubt that Bert's creativity, reliability, energy, commitment and quality of performance were all rescued dramatically by the decision to quit boozing." Jansch and Clements continued the work they had started before Jansch's illness, resulting in the 1988 Leather Launderette album.

== Final years: 1992–2011 ==
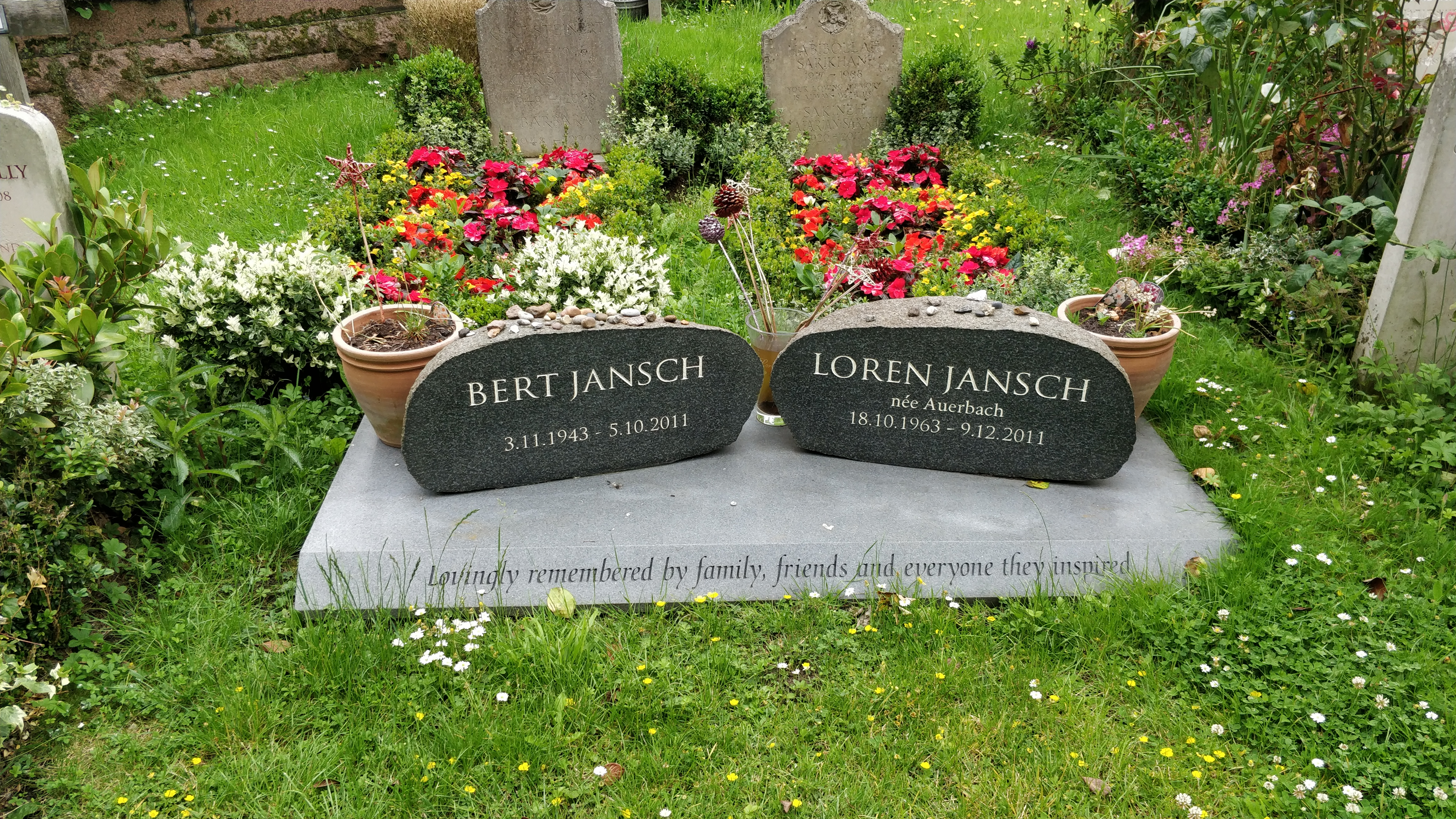
The grave of Bert Jansch and his wife Loren Jansch in Highgate Cemetery, London

Bert was the prime mover in the Acoustic Routes film, first broadcast by the BBC in 1992. It shows him revisiting his old haunts and reminiscing with guests such as Al Stewart, Anne Briggs, John Renbourn, and Davy Graham.

From 1995, Jansch appeared frequently at the 12 Bar Club in Denmark Street, London. One of his live sets there was recorded direct to Digital Audio Tape (DAT) by Jansch's then manager, Alan King, and was released as the Live at the 12 Bar: an official bootleg album in 1996. In 2002, Jansch, Bernard Butler and Johnny "Guitar" Hodge performed live together at the Jazz Cafe, London. Butler had also appeared on Jansch's album of that year, Edge of a Dream, which features (among others) Ralph McTell and guitarist Paul Wassif. The instrumental "Black Cat Blues", featuring Wassif, appears in the 2003 film Calendar Girls, and Wassif became a frequent sideman at Bert's live shows. In 2003, Jansch celebrated his 60th birthday with a concert at the Queen Elizabeth Hall in London. The BBC organised a concert for Jansch and various guests at the church of St Luke Old Street, which was televised on BBC Four.

In 2005, Jansch teamed up again with one of his early influences, Davy Graham, for a small number of concerts in England and Scotland. His concert tour had to be postponed, owing to illness, and Jansch underwent major heart surgery in late 2005. By 2006, he had recovered and was playing concerts again. Jansch's album The Black Swan, his first for four years, was released on Sanctuary on 18 September 2006, featuring Beth Orton and Devendra Banhart on tracks "Katie Cruel", "When the Sun Comes Up" and "Watch the Stars", among other guests. In 2007, he was featured on Babyshambles album, Shotter's Nation, playing acoustic guitar on the song "The Lost Art of Murder". After recording, he accompanied Babyshambles' lead singer Pete Doherty on several acoustic gigs, and performed on the Pete and Carl Reunion Gig, where Libertines and Dirty Pretty Things frontman and guitarist Carl Barât joined Doherty on stage.

In 2009, he played a concert at the London Jazz Cafe to celebrate the release of three of his older albums (LA Turnaround, Santa Barbara Honeymoon and A Rare Conundrum) on CD format. However, later that year, due to an unexpected illness, he had to cancel a 22-date North American tour that was due to start on 26 June. Jansch's website reported: "Bert is very sorry to be missing the tour, and apologises to all the fans who were hoping to see him. He is looking forward to rescheduling as soon as possible."

Jansch opened for Neil Young on his Twisted Road solo tour in the US and Canada, starting on 18 May 2010. He also performed at Eric Clapton's Crossroads festival in June 2010. These were Jansch's first shows since his illness. One of his last recording sessions was with Clapton for Paul Wassif's 2011 album Looking Up Feeling Down. Jansch again opened for Young's 2011 tour, beginning on 15 April in Durham, North Carolina, and having a final solo performance in Chicago on 7 May. That same year, a few reunion gigs also took place with Pentangle, including performances at the Glastonbury Festival and one final concert at the Royal Festival Hall in London, which was Jansch's last ever public performance.

== Personal life and death ==
Suffering from lung cancer, Jansch died on 5 October 2011, aged 67, at a hospice in Hampstead after a long illness. His wife, Loren Jansch (née Auerbach), died of cancer on 9 December 2011, aged 48. They are both buried in Highgate Cemetery.

== Recognition and awards ==
In 2001, Jansch received a Lifetime Achievement Award at the BBC Radio 2 Folk Awards, and on 5 June 2006, he received the MOJO Merit Award at the Mojo Honours List ceremony, based on "an expanded career that still continues to be inspirational." The award was presented by Beth Orton and Roy Harper. Rolling Stone ranked Jansch as No. 94 on its list of the 100 Greatest Guitarists of all Time in 2003.

In January 2007, the five original members of Pentangle (including Jansch) were given a Lifetime Achievement award at the BBC Radio 2 Folk Awards. The award was presented by Sir David Attenborough. Producer John Leonard said "Pentangle were one of the most influential groups of the late 20th century and it would be wrong for the awards not to recognise what an impact they had on the music scene." Pentangle played together for the event, for the first time in more than two decades, and their performance was broadcast on BBC Radio 2 on 7 February 2007. In 2007, Jansch was also awarded an Honorary Doctorate of Music by Edinburgh Napier University, "in recognition of his outstanding contribution to the UK music industry."

== Music ==
Jansch's musical influences included Big Bill Broonzy and Brownie McGhee, whom he first saw playing at The Howff in 1960 and, much later, claimed that he'd "still be a gardener" if he hadn't encountered McGhee and his music. Jansch was also strongly influenced by the British folk music tradition, particularly by Anne Briggs and, to a lesser extent, A.L. Lloyd. Other influences included jazz (notably Charles Mingus), early music (John Renbourn and Julian Bream) and other contemporary singer-songwriters – especially Clive Palmer. The other major influence was Davy Graham who, himself, brought together an eclectic mixture of musical styles. Also, in his formative years, Jansch had busked his way through Europe to Morocco, picking up musical ideas and rhythms from multiple sources. From these influences, he distilled his own individual guitar style.

Some of his songs feature a basic Travis picking style of right-hand playing, but these are often distinguished by unusual chord voicings or by chords with added notes. An example of this is his song "Needle of Death", which features a simple picking style, though several of the chords are decorated with added ninths. Characteristically, the ninths are not the highest note of the chord, but appear in the middle of the arpeggiated finger-picking, creating a "lumpiness" to the sound.

Another characteristic feature was his ability to hold a chord in the lower strings while bending an upper string—often bending up from a semitone below a chord note. These can be heard clearly on songs such as "Reynardine" where the bends are from the diminished fifth to the perfect fifth. Jansch often fitted the accompaniment to the natural rhythm of the words of his songs, rather than playing a consistent rhythm throughout. This can lead to occasional bars appearing in unusual time signatures. For example, his version of the Ewan MacColl song "The First Time Ever I Saw Your Face", unlike most other covers of that song, switches from 4/4 time to 3/4 and 5/4. A similar disregard for conventional time signatures is found in several of his collaborative compositions with Pentangle: for instance, "Light Flight" from the Basket of Light album includes sections in 5/8, 7/8 and 6/4 time.

== Instruments ==
Through the development of Pentangle, Jansch played a number of instruments: banjo, Appalachian dulcimer, recorder, and concertina—on rare occasions he was even known to play piano and electric guitar. However, it is his acoustic guitar playing that was most notable.

Jansch's first guitar was home-made from a kit but when he left school and started work, he bought a Höfner cello-style guitar. Soon he traded this in for a Zenith which was marketed as the "Lonnie Donegan guitar" and which Jansch played in the folk clubs in the early 1960s. His first album was reputedly recorded using a Martin 00028 borrowed from Martin Carthy. Pictures of Jansch in the middle 1960s show him playing a variety of models, including Martin and Epiphone guitars. He had a guitar hand-built by John Bailey, which was used for most of the Pentangle recordings but was eventually stolen.

Jansch later played two six-string guitars built by the Coventry-based luthier Rob Armstrong, one of which appears on the front and back covers of the 1980 Shanachie release, Best of Bert Jansch. He then had a contract with Yamaha, who provided him with an FG1500 which he played, along with a Yamaha LL11 1970s jumbo guitar. Jansch's relationship with Yamaha continued and they presented him with an acoustic guitar with gold trim and abalone inlay for his 60th birthday—although Jansch was quoted as saying that, valued at about £3,000, it was too good for stage use.

== Influence ==
Jansch's music, and particularly his acoustic guitar playing, have influenced a range of well-known musicians. His first album (Bert Jansch, 1965) was much admired, with Jimmy Page saying, "At one point, I was absolutely obsessed with Bert Jansch. When I first heard that LP, I couldn't believe it. It was so far ahead of what everyone else was doing. No one in America could touch that." The same debut album included Jansch's version of the Davy Graham instrumental "Angie". This was a favourite of Mike Oldfield, who practised acoustic guitar alone as a child, and was then heavily influenced by Jansch's style. The title of the instrumental inspired Oldfield to call his first band (with sister Sally) the Sallyangie.

Jansch's version of "Angie" inspired Paul Simon's recording of the piece, which was retitled "Anji" and appeared on the Simon & Garfunkel album Sounds of Silence. From the same era, Neil Young is quoted as saying: "As much of a great guitar player as Jimi [Hendrix] was, Bert Jansch is the same thing for acoustic guitar... and my favourite." Nick Drake and Donovan were both admirers of Jansch. Both recorded cover versions of his songs, and Donovan went on to dedicate two of his own songs to Jansch: "Bert's Blues" appeared on his Sunshine Superman LP, and "House of Jansch" on his fourth album Mellow Yellow. Other tributes included Gordon Giltrap's album Janschology (2000) which has two tunes by Jansch, plus two others that show his influence.

Johnny Marr, who rose to prominence as the guitarist of the Smiths, named Jansch as one of his three biggest influences.

== Discography ==
Studio albums

- 1965: Bert Jansch
- 1965: It Don't Bother Me
- 1966: Jack Orion
- 1967: Nicola
- 1969: Birthday Blues
- 1971: Rosemary Lane
- 1973: Moonshine
- 1974: L.A. Turnaround
- 1975: Santa Barbara Honeymoon
- 1977: A Rare Conundrum (released 1976 as Poor Mouth with alternate track listing)
- 1978: Avocet
- 1980: Thirteen Down (as The Bert Jansch Conundrum)
- 1982: Heartbreak
- 1985: From the Outside
- 1990: Sketches
- 1990: The Ornament Tree
- 1995: When the Circus Comes to Town
- 1998: Toy Balloon
- 2000: Crimson Moon
- 2002: Edge of a Dream
- 2006: The Black Swan

== Bibliography ==
- Harper, Colin (2000). Dazzling Stranger: Bert Jansch and the British Folk and Blues Revival. London: Bloomsbury Publishing. ISBN 978-0-7475-4810-2.
- Harper, Colin (2006). Dazzling Stranger: Bert Jansch and the British Folk and Blues Revival (Revised ed.). London: Bloomsbury Publishing. ISBN 978-0-7475-8725-5.
  - Harper's 2006 revised edition is expanded by 38 pages when compared to his original 2000 publication
- Kennedy, Doug (1983). The Songs and Guitar Solos of Bert Jansch. New Punchbowl Music.
  - Although Kennedy's is a book of music, it contains a great deal of biographical information and photographs of Bert Jansch.
