= John Renbourn discography =

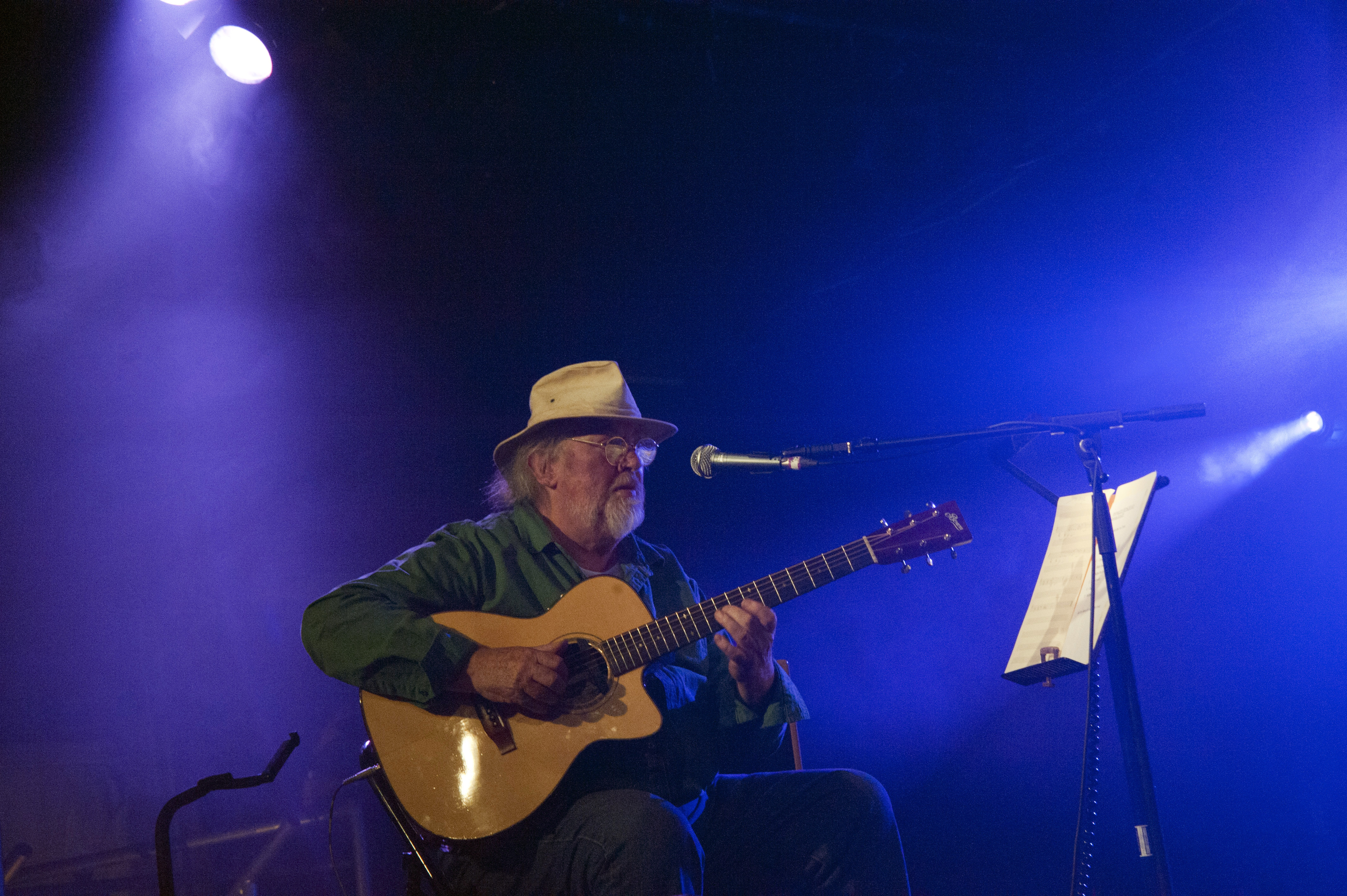
- At the Cambridge Folk Festival in 2011
- Studio albums: 20
- Live albums: 5
- Compilation albums: 19
- Singles: 1
- Video albums: 2

John Renbourn was an English guitarist and composer. His discography consists of 20 studio albums, 5 live albums, 19 compilations, and 2 videos. In addition, his compositions and guitar work have been featured on a number of albums by other artists.

== Solo albums ==
- 1965: John Renbourn (Transatlantic Records)
- 1966: Another Monday (Transatlantic)
- 1968: Sir John Alot of Merrie Englandes Musyk Thyng and ye Grene Knyghte (Transatlantic)
- 1970: The Lady and the Unicorn (Transatlantic)
- 1971: Faro Annie (Transatlantic)
- 1973: Heads and Tales (Transatlantic) Compilation - one track only
- 1976: The Guitar of John Renbourn (KPM Music) released 2005, a.k.a. The Guitar Artistry of John Renbourn
- 1976: The Hermit (Transatlantic)
- 1977: A Maid in Bedlam (Transatlantic)
- 1979: The Black Balloon (Transatlantic)
- 1979: So Early in the Spring (Columbia Records)
- 1979: One Morning Very Early (Transatlantic)
- 1980: The Enchanted Garden (Transatlantic) with the John Renbourn Group.
- 1982: Live in America (Flying Fish Records) with the John Renbourn Group.
- 1986: The Nine Maidens (Flying Fish Records)
- 1988: Folk Blues of John Renbourn (Demon Music Group)
- 1988: John Renbourn's Ship of Fools (Transatlantic)
- 1996: Lost Sessions (Edsel)
- 1998: Traveller's Prayer (Shanachie)
- 2006: John Renbourn & Friends (KPM Music Ltd)
- 2011: Palermo Snow (Shanachie)

== As a member of Pentangle ==
- 1968: The Pentangle (Transatlantic)
- 1968: Sweet Child (Transatlantic)
- 1969: Basket of Light (Transatlantic)
- 1970: Cruel Sister (Transatlantic)
- 1971: Reflection (Transatlantic)
- 1972: Solomon's Seal (Reprise)
- 2016: Finale: An Evening With... (Topic)

== Collaborations ==
=== With Duck Baker ===
- 1992: A Thousand Words (Acoustic Music)

=== With Robin Williamson ===
- 1992: Wheel of Fortune (Flying Fish)

=== With Dorris Henderson ===
- 1965: There You Go (Big Beat)
- 1967: Watch the Stars (Fontana Records)

=== With Stefan Grossman ===
- 1978: John Renbourn and Stefan Grossman (Kicking Mule Records)
- 1979: Under the Volcano (Kicking Mule)
- 1982: Keeper of the Vine: Best of John Renbourn and Stefan Grossman (Shanachie) contains selected tracks from John Renbourn and Stefan Grossman and from Under the Volcano
- 1984: Live... In Concert (Shanachie)
- 1987: The Three Kingdoms (Sonet)
- 1997: Snap a Little Owl (Shanachie) contains 10 tracks from John Renbourn and Stefan Grossman and 3 tracks from Under the Volcano

=== With Bert Jansch ===
- 1966: Jack Orion (Transatlantic)
- 1966: Bert and John (Transatlantic) - re-released with additional tracks by Bert Jansch under the title After the Dance in 1992 on Shanachie
- 1982: How To Play Folk Guitar with (Transatlantic) - compilation
- 1982: Renbourn & Jansch (Cambra) - compilation

=== With Wizz Jones ===
- 2016: Joint Control (World Music Network)

== Live albums ==
- 1981: Live in America (Flying Fish) with the John Renbourn Group
- 1984: Live ... In Concert (Shanachie) with Stefan Grossman
- 1993: Wheel of Fortune (Demon) with Robin Williamson
- 1998: BBC Live in Concert (Strange Fruit)
- 2006: Live in Italy (Libera Informazione Editrice)

== Compilations ==
- 1971: The John Renbourn Sampler (Transatlantic)
- 1973: So Clear: The John Renbourn Sampler Volume Two (Transatlantic)
- 1973: John Renbourn (Reprise) - released in US and Canada
- 1979: The Lady And The Unicorn (Transatlantic) - compilation of two albums: Sir John A lot of... and The Lady And The Unicorn
- 1980: John Renbourn / Another Monday (Transatlantic) -compilation of two albums
- 1986: The Essential Collection Vol 1: The Soho Years (Transatlantic)
- 1987: The Essential Collection Vol 2: The Moon Shines Bright (Transatlantic)
- 1989: A Mediaeval Almanack (Demon / Transatlantic)
- 1992: The Essential John Renbourn (Demon)
- 1995: Will the Circle Be Unbroken: The Collection (Castle Music)
- 1996: The Lady And The Unicorn / The Hermit (Essential / Castle) - compilation of two albums
- 1998: Definitive Transatlantic Collection (Transatlantic)
- 1999: Collected (Music Club)
- 2000: Down on the Barge (Delta)
- 2000: The Transatlantic Anthology (Castle)
- 2001: Heritage (EMI Plus)
- 2001: The Best Of John Renbourn (Castle Pulse)
- 2007: Nobody's Fault But Mine: The Anthology (Transatlantic)
- 2015: The Attic Tapes (Riverboat)

== Singles ==
- 1972: "The Cuckoo" / "Little Sadie" (Transatlantic)

== DVDs ==
- 2004: Rare Performances 1965-1995 (Vestapol)
- 2004: John Renbourn & Jacqui McShee in Concert (Vestapol) with Jacqui McShee

== Other appearances ==
- 1965: Bert Jansch - It Don't Bother Me (Transatlantic) - guitar on track 7, "My Lover"; track 10, "Lucky Thirteen"
- 1966: Bert Jansch - Jack Orion (Transatlantic) - guitar on track 1, "The Waggoner's Lad"; track 3, "Jack Orion"; track 6, "Henry Martin"; track 8, "Pretty Polly"
- 1966: Julie Felix - Changes (Fontana) - guitar
- 1967: Roy Harper - Sophisticated Beggar (Strike) - guitar
- 1972: Wizz Jones - Right Now (Columbia) - production, sitar
- 1975: John James - Head In The Clouds (Transatlantic) - guitar on track 1, "Georgemas Junction"; track 5, "Wormwood Tangle"; track 6, "Stranger In The World"
- 1976: John James - Descriptive Guitar Instrumentals (Kicking Mule) - guitar on track 2, "New Nothynge"; track 6, "From The Bridge"; track 8, "Guitar Jump"
- 1978: John James - In Concert (Kicking Mule) - guitar
- 1985: John Paul Jones - Scream for Help (Atlantic Records) - guitar on track 8, "When You Fall In Love"
- 1986: Emilio Cao - Amiga Alba E Delgada (Edigal) - guitar
- 1999: Larry Conklin - Stranger World (In-Akustik) - guitar
- 2001: Wizz Jones - Lucky the Man (Hux Records)
- 2001: Roy Harper - Royal Festival Hall Live – June 10th 2001 (Science Friction) - guitar on track 2–4, "Key to the Highway"; track 2–6, "Sophisticated Beggar"

== As composer ==
- 1963: Joan Baez - Joan Baez in Concert, Part 2 (Vanguard) - track 1, "Once I Had A Sweetheart" (co-written with Bert Jansch)
- 1965: Bert Jansch - It Don't Bother Me (Transatlantic) - track 10, "Lucky Thirteen"
- 1969: The Alan Tew Orchestra & Chorus - Let's Fly (CBS) - track 6, "Light Flight" (co-written with Danny Thompson, Jacqui McShee, Bert Jansch, and Terry Cox)
- 1971: Bert Jansch - Rosemary Lane (Transatlantic) - track 10, "Peregrinations" (co-written with Bert Jansch)
- 1973: Davey Johnstone - Smiling Face (Sound City) - track 7, "After the Dance" (co-written with Bert Jansch)
- 1974: Bert Jansch - L.A. Turnaround (Charisma Records) - track 9, "Lady Nothing"
- 1975: John James - Head In The Clouds (Transatlantic) - track 5, "Wormwood Tangle"
- 1976: John James - Descriptive Guitar Instrumentals (Kicking Mule) - track 2, "New Nothynge"; track 6, "From The Bridge"
- 1977: Paul Van Suetendael, Eric Melaerts, Didier - 3 Guitars (Best Seller) - track 4, "Lady Nothing"
- 1979: Steve Waring and Roger Mason - Guitare Américaine (Spécial Instrumental) - track 9, "Judy"
- 1980: The Wildwood Pickers - First Harvest (Clogging Chicken) - track t, "Little Sadie"
- 2000: various artists - People on the Highway: A Bert Jansch Encomium (Market Square Records) - track 2–3, "When I Get Home" (co-written with Danny Thompson, Jacqui McShee, Bert Jansch, and Terry Cox)
- 2001: David Williams - Wishmaster 2: Evil Never Dies – Original Motion Picture Score (Beyond Music) - track 4, "Morgana" (co-written with David Williams)
- 2003: Gordon Giltrap - Remember This (La Cooka Ratcha) - track 7, "Lady Nothing"
- 2004: The Green House Band - Mirage (Market Square Records) - track 3, "The Drifter"
- 2004: Jim Ronayne - The Voyage of the Dunbrody (self-released) - track 7, "The Pelican"
- 2004: Penelope Houston - Snapshot (Flare Records) - track 2, "I've Got A Feeling" (co-written with Danny Thompson, Jacqui McShee, Bert Jansch, and Terry Cox)
- 2006: Bonobo - Days to Come (Ninja Tune) - track 7, "Hatoa" (co-written with Danny Thompson, Jacqui McShee, Bert Jansch, and Terry Cox)
- 2012: Quantic & Alice Russell with The Combo Bárbaro - Look Around the Corner (Tru Thoughts) - track 3, "Travelling Song" (co-written with Danny Thompson, Jacqui McShee, Bert Jansch, and Terry Cox)
- 2013: Méav Ní Mhaolchatha - The Calling (Warner Classics) - track 3, "Light Flight" (co-written with Danny Thompson, Jacqui McShee, Bert Jansch, and Terry Cox)
