= Hermit (disambiguation) =

A hermit is a person who lives in seclusion from society.

Hermit may also refer to

== Geography ==
- Hermit Island (disambiguation)
- Hermit Islands, Bismarck Archipelago, Papua New Guinea
- Hermit Mountain, British Columbia, Canada
- Hermit Peak, New Mexico, United States
- Hermit Trail, a hiking trail in Grand Canyon National Park, Arizona
- The Hermit (California mountain), a summit in the Sierra Nevada

== Arts and entertainment ==
- A Hermit, a 1661 painting by Gerrit Dou
- The Hermit (Il solitario), a 1908 painting by John Singer Sargent
- The Hermit (novel), a 1973 novel by Eugène Ionesco
- The Hermit (band), a Canadian electronica band
- The Hermit (album), a 1976 album by John Renbourn
- Hermit (album), a 1997 album by Ron "Bumblefoot" Thal
- The Hermit, a painting used on the inner sleeve of the 1971 Led Zeppelin album Led Zeppelin IV

== Other uses ==
- Garden hermit, or ornamental hermit, a person invited to live as a hermit on a wealthy landowner's estate
- Hermit, a type of spiced cookie
- Hermit (horse) (1864–1890), English thoroughbred
- Hermit (hummingbird), the hummingbird subfamily Phaethornithinae
- Hermit language, an extinct language that was spoken in Papua New Guinea
- The Hermit (tarot card), a trump card in tarot
- Hermit House, an example of vernacular architecture in Herzliya, Israel
- Hermit, a class in the online role-playing game MapleStory
- Hermit, a Boss in the game Shadow Fight 2

== See also ==
- List of people known as the Hermit
- Hermit beetle, a species of European beetle Osmoderma eremita
- Hermit butterfly, the brush-footed butterfly Chazara briseis
- Hermit crab, a crustacean of the superfamily Paguroidea
- Drenthe hermits, seven people discovered in Ruinerwold
- Esther Hermitte, a social anthropologist from Argentina
- Herman's Hermits, an English pop band
- Hermit Formation, an American geologic formation
- Hermite (disambiguation)
- Hermitage (disambiguation)
