= Live 1994 =

Live album by Pentangle
- Released: 1994
- Genre: Folk, folk rock
- Label: Hypertension

Pentangle chronology
One More Road (1993)	Live 1994 (1994)	Light Flight (1997)

Professional ratings
Review scores
Source	Rating
Allmusic	3/5 stars

Live 1994 is a live album by Pentangle, released in 1994. It was reissued along with One More Road on CD in 2007.

== Track listing ==
1. "Bramble Briar"
2. "Sally Free and Easy"
3. "Kingfisher"
4. "Come Back Baby"
5. "When I Was in My Prime"
6. "Meet on the Bone"
7. "Travelling Solo"
8. "The Bonny Boy"
9. "Chasing Love"
10. "Cruel Sister" (Traditional, arranged Jansch, Renbourn, Cox)
11. "Yarrow"
12. "Reynardine"

== Personnel ==
- Bert Jansch - vocals, acoustic guitar
- Jacqui McShee - vocals
- Peter Kirtley - vocals, electric and acoustic guitar
- Nigel Portman-Smith - bass, piano, keyboards
- Gerry Conway - drums, percussion, conga
