= Refrain =

Repeated lines in music or poetry

Musical notation for the chorus of "Jingle Bells"

A refrain (from Vulgar Latin: refringere, "to repeat", through Old French: refraindre) is the line or lines that are repeated in poetry or in music—the "chorus" of a song. Poetic fixed forms that feature refrains include the villanelle, the virelay, and the sestina.

In popular music, the refrain or chorus may contrast with the verse melodically, rhythmically, and harmonically; it may assume a higher level of dynamics and activity, often with added instrumentation. Chorus form, or strophic form, is a sectional and/or additive way of structuring a piece of music based on the repetition of one formal section or block played.

The identification of a chorus does not depend on a single defining characteristic but can be understood in terms of a combination of prototypical features, including recurrence, lyrical repetition, contrast with verse material, tonal closure, increased instrumental density, and prominent placement of the song title. Drawing on Trevor de Clercq's prototype-based approach to song form, a 2026 study by Ralf von Appen and Jonas Kastenhuber examined fourteen such characteristics in Taylor Swift's songwriting. The study found that her indie-folk-influenced albums Folklore and Evermore exhibited substantially fewer prototypical chorus features than her earlier albums Fearless and Lover. In several songs, the researchers could not identify an unambiguous chorus, illustrating how the construction and perception of choruses can vary across stylistic contexts.

== Usage in history ==
Although repeats of refrains may use different words, refrains are made recognizable by reusing the same melody (when sung as music) and by preserving any rhymes. For example, "The Star-Spangled Banner" contains a refrain which is introduced by a different phrase in each verse, but which always ends:

O'er the land of the free, and the home of the brave.

A similar refrain is found in the "Battle Hymn of the Republic", which affirms in successive verses that "Our God", or "His Truth", is "marching on".

Refrains usually, but not always, come at the end of the verse. Some songs, especially ballads, incorporate refrains (or burdens) into each verse. For example, one version of the traditional ballad "The Cruel Sister" includes a refrain mid-verse:

There lived a lady by the North Sea shore,
Lay the bent to the bonny broom
Two daughters were the babes she bore.
Fa la la la la la la la la.
As one grew bright as is the sun,
Lay the bent to the bonny broom
So coal black grew the other one.
Fa la la la la la la la.

(Note: the refrain of "Lay the bent to the bonny broom" is not traditionally associated with the ballad of "The Cruel Sister" (Child #10). This was the work of "pop-folk" group Pentangle on their 1970 LP Cruel Sister, which has subsequently been picked up by many folk singers as being traditional. Both the melody and the refrain come from the ballad known as "Riddles Wisely Expounded" (Child #1).)

Here, the refrain is syntactically independent of the narrative poem in the song and has no very direct relationship to its subject. (It describes the tranquil domestic task of renewing or repairing a besom.) The device can also convey material which relates to the subject of the poem. Such a refrain is found in Dante Gabriel Rossetti's "Troy Town":

Heavenborn Helen, Sparta's queen,
O Troy Town!
Had two breasts of heavenly sheen,
The sun and moon of the heart's desire:
All Love's lordship lay between,
A sheen on the breasts I Love.
O Troy's down,
Tall Troy's on fire!

Phrases of apparent nonsense in refrains (Lay the bent to the bonny broom?), and syllables such as fa la la, familiar from the Christmas carol "Deck the Halls with Boughs of Holly", have given rise to much speculation. Some believe that the traditional refrain Hob a derry down O encountered in some English folksongs is in fact an ancient Celtic phrase meaning "dance around the oak tree". These suggestions remain controversial.

== In popular music ==
There are two distinct uses of the word "chorus". In the thirty-two bar song form that was most common in the earlier twentieth-century popular music (especially the Tin Pan Alley tradition), "chorus" referred to the entire main section of the song (which was in a thirty-two bar AABA form). Beginning in the rock music of the 1950s, another form became more common in commercial pop music, which was based in an open-ended cycle of verses instead of a fixed 32-bar form. In this form (which is more common than thirty-two bar form in later-twentieth century pop music), "choruses" repeated with fixed lyrics are alternated with a sequence of different "verses". In this use of the word, chorus contrasts with the verse, which usually has a sense of leading up to the chorus. "Many popular songs, particularly from early in this century, are in a verse and a chorus (refrain) form. Most popular songs from the middle of the century consist only of a chorus."

While the terms "refrain" and "chorus" often are used synonymously, it has been suggested to use "refrain" exclusively for a recurring line of identical text and melody which is part of a formal section—an A section in an AABA form (as in "I Got Rhythm": "...who could ask for anything more?") or a verse (as in "Blowin' in the Wind": "...the answer my friend is blowing in the wind")—whereas "chorus" shall refer to a discrete form part (as in "Yellow Submarine": "We all live in a..."). According to the musicologists Ralf von Appen and Markus Frei-Hauenschild:

In German, the term "Refrain" is used synonymously with "chorus" when referring to a chorus within the verse/chorus form. At least one English-language author, Richard Middleton, uses the term in the same way. In English usage, however, the term, "refrain" typically refers to what in German is more precisely called the "Refrainzeile" (refrain line): a lyric at the beginning or end of a section that is repeated in every iteration. In this usage, the refrain does not constitute a discrete, independent section within the form.

== In jazz ==
Many Tin Pan Alley songs using thirty-two bar form are central to the traditional jazz repertoire. In jazz arrangements the word "chorus" refers to the same unit of music as in the Tin Pan Alley tradition, but unlike the Tin Pan Alley tradition, a single song can have more than one chorus. Von Appen and Frei-Hauenschild explain: "The term 'chorus' can also refer to a single iteration of the entire 32 bars of the AABA form, especially among jazz musicians, who improvise over multiple repetitions of such choruses."

=== Arranger's chorus ===
In jazz, an arranger's chorus is where the arranger uses particularly elaborate techniques to exhibit their skill and to impress the listener. This may include use of counterpoint, reharmonization, tone color, or any other arranging device. The arranger's chorus is generally not the first or the last chorus of a jazz performance.

=== Shout chorus ===
In jazz, a shout chorus (occasionally, out chorus) is usually the last chorus of a big band arrangement and is characterized by being the most energetic, lively, and exciting and by containing the musical climax of the piece. A shout chorus characteristically employs extreme ranges, loud dynamics, and a re-arrangement of melodic motives into short, accented riffs. Shout choruses often feature tutti or concerted writing, but may also use contrapuntal writing or call and response between the brass and saxophones or between the ensemble and the drummer. Additionally, brass players frequently use extended techniques such as falls, doits, turns, and shakes to add excitement.

== See also ==
- Bridge (music)
- Hook (music)
- Pallavi, a refrain in carnatic music
- Ritornello
