= Think of Tomorrow =

Studio album by Pentangle
- Released: October 1991
- Recorded: 1991
- Studio: O-TON/Ougenweide Studios, Hamburg
- Genre: Folk rock
- Label: Ariola/Hypertension
- Producer: Pentangle

Pentangle chronology
So Early in the Spring (1989)	Think of Tomorrow (1991)	One More Road (1993)

Professional ratings
Review scores
Source	Rating
AllMusic	2.5/5 stars

Think of Tomorrow is the tenth album by Pentangle. It was released on Ariola/Hypertension 883 697/HYCD 200 112 in 1991. Green Linnet released it in the same year on GLCD-3057. Hypertension re-released it in 2005. The notable change in personnel was Peter Kirtley who replaced Rod Clements.

== Track listing ==
1. "O'er the Lonely Mountain" (Pentangle)
2. "Baby Now It's Over" (Pentangle)
3. "Share a Dream" (Pentangle)
4. "The Storyteller [Paddy's Song]" (Pentangle)
5. "Meat on the Bone" (Pentangle)
6. "Ever Yes, Ever No" (Pentangle)
7. "Straight Ahead" (Pentangle)
8. "The Toss of Golden Hair" (Trad)
9. "The Lark in the Clear Air" (Trad)
10. "The Bonny Boy" (Trad)
11. "Colour My Paintbook" (Pentangle)

== Personnel ==
- Jacqui McShee - vocals, handclapping
- Bert Jansch - vocals, acoustic guitar, electric piano
- Peter Kirtley - vocals, electric and acoustic guitar, mandolin
- Gerry Conway - drums, percussion, conga
- Nigel Portman Smith - bass, piano, keyboards
- Frank Wulff (guest) - flute, whistle
