= Glasgerion =

Traditional song

Glasgerion is Child ballad 67 (Roud 145), existing in several variants.

== Synopsis ==
Glasgerion is a king's son and a harper. He harps before another king, whose daughter arranges a tryst with him. He tells his servant to ensure that he wakes in time to make the tryst. The servant goes in his place and, mistaking him for Glasgerion, the princess has sex with the servant. She learns the truth and kills herself, sometimes because she can not offer herself as Glasgerion's bride. Glasgerion kills his servant and either kills himself as well or goes mad.

== Motifs ==
The figure of Glasgerion was cited as a harper in Geoffrey Chaucer's The House of Fame and Gavin Douglas's The Palice of Honour.

== Adaptations ==
In the 1960s, when the song had long fallen out of the tradition, the scholar and revivalist singer A.L. Lloyd revised it under the name of "Jack Orion". This version, in which the harpist becomes a fiddler, appeared on his 1966 album First Person with Dave Swarbrick on fiddle. In the same year Bert Jansch made "Jack Orion" the title track of his third album. His voice is accompanied by his own guitar and that of John Renbourn; their collaboration here can be seen as one of the pinnacles of the folk baroque guitar style. "Jack Orion" later became part of the repertoire of Pentangle, the band that Jansch and Renbourn formed along with Terry Cox, Jacqui McShee and Danny Thompson, and appears on their 1970 recording Cruel Sister. Martin Carthy and Dave Swarbrick performed "Jack Orion" on their 1968 album But Two Came By. In the sleeve notes Carthy observed that "the song in its traditional form was, according to evidence at our [his and A. L. Lloyd’s] disposal, not very widespread, which serves to highlight one of the curious features of the folk revival, that is, the many songs which were not at all common in tradition are very commonly sung in the revival and vice versa."

The British folk rock band Trees included a version of Glasgerion in The Garden of Jane Delawney, their 1970 debut album. Other renditions include one on Fairport Convention's 1978 album, Tipplers Tales (again with Dave Swarbrick on fiddle), and one on Galley Beggar's 2015 album, Silence & Tears. "Jack Orion" also appears Fay Hield and The Hurricane Party's third album Old Adam (2016).
