= Black Balloon =

Black Balloon may refer to:

- The Black Balloon (album), a 1979 album by English folk musician, John Renbourn
- The Black Balloon (film), a 2008 Australian film, directed by Elissa Down
- "Black Balloon" (Goo Goo Dolls song), a 1998 song by the Goo Goo Dolls
- "Black Balloon" (The Kills song), a 2009 single by The Kills
- "Black Balloon", an acoustic track by Monster Magnet on their album Superjudge
