= Feoffees' Lands =

2005 album by Pentangle

Studio album by Pentangle
- Released: August 2005
- Recorded: Presshouse Studio, Devon by Mark Tucker
- Genre: Folk, folk rock
- Length: 55:55
- Label: GJS
- Producer: Gerry Conway, Spencer Cozens, Jacqui McShee

Pentangle chronology
Light Flight: The Anthology (2001)	Feoffees' Lands (2005)

Feoffees' Lands is an album by Jacqui McShee's Pentangle. It was released on the GJS label in 2005.

== Track listing ==
1. "Banks of the Nile" (Traditional) – 6:35
2. "Nothing Really Changes" (Gerry Conway, Spencer Cozens, Jacqui McShee) – 5:53
3. "Acrobat (It's Just a Circus)" (Conway, Cozens, McShee) – 5:37
4. "Now's the Time" (Conway, Cozens, McShee) – 4:20
5. "Hot Air - Hot Night" (Conway, Cozens, McShee) – 6:05
6. "No Sweet Sorrow" (Conway, Cozens, David Hughes, McShee) – 3:39
7. "Sovay" (Traditional) – 5:24
8. "Two Magicians" (Traditional) – 5:41
9. "You've Changed" (Carey, Fischer) – 4:49
10. "Broomfield Hill" (Traditional) – 7:52

== Personnel ==
Pentangle

- Jacqui McShee — lead vocals; backing vocals (track 4)
- Gary Foote — alto saxophone (track 1), tenor saxophone (tracks 2, 5–7, 9), clarinet (track 3), baritone saxophone (track 4), flute (track 4)
- Spencer Cozens — keyboards (tracks 1–5, 7, 8, 10), lead vocals (tracks 1, 3, 4), backing vocals (tracks 2, 5–8), acoustic guitar (track 2), percussion (track 4), piano (tracks 6, 9), vibratone bells (track 6)
- Alan Thomson — bass (tracks 1, 2, 5, 6, 8, 10), electric guitar (tracks 2, 5)
- Gerry Conway — drums; percussion (tracks 1, 5, 6, 8, 10), backing vocals (tracks 2, 4, 5)

Additional Personnel

- Mark Tucker — backing vocals (track 5)
- Leah McShee Jackson, daughter of Jacqui McShee — backing vocals (tracks 2, 3, 7)
- Nathan Bray — trumpet (tracks 2, 3, 6), flugelhorn (track 5)
- Barnaby Dickinson — trombone (tracks 2, 3, 5, 6)
- Ravi — kora (tracks 1, 4–6, 8), Tibetan overtone singing (track 1), percussion (track 1)
- Martin Barre — electric guitar (tracks 8, 10), acoustic guitar (track 10)
- David Hughes — acoustic guitar (track 6)
- John Giblin — acoustic bass (tracks 1, 3, 4, 7, 9)
- Miles Bould — percussion (tracks 1, 2, 4–8, 10)
