= So Early in the Spring =

So Early in the Spring may refer to:

- So Early in the Spring (Pentangle album), 1989
- So Early in the Spring (Judy Collins album), 1977
