= One More Road =

Studio album by Pentangle
- Released: May 1993
- Genre: Folk rock

Pentangle chronology
Think of Tomorrow (1991)	One More Road (1993)	Live 1994 (1994)

Professional ratings
Review scores
Source	Rating
Allmusic	3.5/5 stars

One More Road is the eleventh album by Pentangle. It was released in the UK on the Permanent label, PERM CD 11 in May 1993. In Germany it was released in 1993 on SPV Records, SPV M29235. It was reissued along with Live 1994 on CD in 2007.

== Track listing ==
1. "Travelling Solo"
2. "Oxford City"
3. "Endless Sky"
4. "The Lily of the West"
5. "One More Road"
6. "High Germany"
7. "Hey, Hey Soldier"
8. "Willy of Winsbury"
9. "Somali"
10. "Manuel"
11. "Are You Going to Scarborough Fair?"

== Personnel ==
- Jacqui McShee - vocals; lead vocals (tracks 1, 2, 5, 6, 8–10)
- Bert Jansch - vocals, banjo, acoustic guitar; lead vocals (tracks 4, 7, 9, 11)
- Peter Kirtley - vocals, electric and acoustic guitar; lead vocals (track 3)
- Nigel Portman-Smith - bass, piano, keyboards
- Gerry Conway - drums, percussion, congas
- Mike Piggott - violin (tracks 4, 6, 8)
- Paul Brennan - whistle (track 6)
