= Cloé Madanes =

Argentinian-American psychotherapist and author

- Born: 1940 (age 84–85); Buenos Aires, Argentina
- Education: Faculty of Philosophy and Letters, University of Buenos Aires (1965, Licenciate in Psychology)
- Occupation(s): Director, the Robbins-Madanes Center of Strategic Intervention
- Known for: Innovator and teacher of family and grief therapy
- Website: cloemadanes.com

Cloé Madanes (born 1940) is an Argentine psychologist with an educational background specialising in family and grief therapy. She worked along with Tony Robbins to train strategic interventionists in finding solutions to resolve interpersonal conflict, prevent violence, and contribute to the creation of a more cohesive and civil community.

== Professional works ==
Cloé Madanes studied psychology in Buenos Aires, Argentina. She was a student of intervention teacher Milton H. Erickson, and was one of the founders of the strategic approach. She is a clinical member, supervisor and fellow of the American Association of Marriage and Family Therapy.

She worked at the University of Maryland Hospital as a clinical assistant professor in the Department of Psychiatry beginning in 1974. She was also an assistant professor at Howard University Hospital. After several years, she was offered the position of Adjunct Associate Professor of Psychiatry at the University of Maryland. She held this position from 1980 to 1984. She and her former partner, Jay Haley, founded the Family Therapy Institute of Washington, D.C., and the Family Therapy Center of Maryland where she served as the director until their divorce in the 1990s.

Madanes has written a number of books: Strategic Family Therapy, Behind the One-Way Mirror, Sex, Love and Violence, The Secret Meaning of Money, and The Violence of Men. Her books have been translated into more than twenty languages. She has presented her work at professional conferences around the world. She has won several awards for contribution to psychology and has been featured in Newsweek, Vogue magazine, The Washington Post, and The Boston Globe.

Since 2002, Madanes has worked with Tony Robbins, developing the new field of Strategic Intervention. With Robbins, Cloe co-founded the Council for the Human Rights of Children, co-sponsored by the University of San Francisco, which applies the insights of Strategic Intervention for the protection and healthy upbringing of at-risk children.

== Honors ==
- 1996: Egner Foundation Award for Distinguished Contribution in the fields of Psychology, Anthropology and Philosophy, University of Zurich, Switzerland.
- 2000: Award for Distinguished Contribution to Psychology, California Psychological Association.
- 2005: Presented with a Certificate of Honor by Gavin Newsom, Mayor of the City and County of San Francisco, on behalf of the City and County, for her advocacy in international children's concerns and as one of the foremost pioneers of strategic family therapy.
- 2005: Recognized as a Master Therapist by the American Psychotherapy Association.

== Publications ==
- "Strategic Family Therapy", Madanes, C., Jossey-Bass Inc., San Francisco, 1981.
- "Behind the One-Way Mirror: Advances in the Practice of Strategic Therapy", Madanes, C., Jossey-Bass Inc., San Francisco, 1984.
- "Sex, Love, and Violence: Strategies for Transformation", Madanes, C., W.W. Norton, New York, 1990.
- "The Secret Meaning of Money", Madanes, C. and Madanes, C., Jossey-Bass, San Francisco, 1994.
- "The Violence of Men: New Techniques for Working with Abusive Families", Madanes, C., with Keim, J. and Smelser, D., Jossey-Bass, San Francisco, 1995.
- "Shame: How To Bring a Sense of Right and Wrong into the Family," Madanes, C., in Zeig, J.K. (Ed.) THE EVOLUTION OF PSYCHOTHERAPY: THE THIRD CONFERENCE (pp. 257–267 & 269). New York : Brunner/Mazel, Inc., 1997.
- "Rebels With a Cause," Madanes, C., THE FAMILY NETWORKER, July–August, 2000.
- "The Godfather Strategy: Finding the Offer a Client Can’t Refuse," Madanes, C., THE FAMILY NETWORKER, Nov.-Dec., 2000.
- "Leadership in Times of Crisis at Addiction Treatment Centers," Madanes, C., COUNSELOR, June 2004, Vol. 5.
- "Remembering Our Heritage," Madanes, C., PSYCHOTHERAPY NETWORKER, November–December, 2004.
- “The Therapist as Humanist, Social Activist and Systemic Thinker and Other Selected Papers", Madanes, C., Zeig and Tucker, New York, 2006
- "Relationship Breakthrough", Madanes, Rodale, Inc., 2009
