= Lhermitte =

Lhermitte may refer to:

- Jean Lhermitte (1877–1959), French neurologist and neuropsychiatrist
  - Lhermitte's sign, also called Barber Chair Phenomenon, an electrical sensation produced by bending the neck forward or backward
  - Lhermitte–Duclos disease, tumor of the cerebellum
- Léon Augustin Lhermitte (1844–1925), French realist painter and etcher; father of Jean
- Pierre Lhermite, French admiral
- Roger Lhermitte (1920–2016), French meteorologist who pioneered the development of meteorological Doppler radar
- Thierry Lhermitte (born 1952), French actor

== See also ==
- Hermitte (disambiguation)
- L'Hermite (disambiguation)
