= Solomon's Seal (album) =

Studio album by Pentangle
- Released: September 1972
- Recorded: February–March 1972
- Studios: Sound Techniques, London
- Genres: Folk, folk rock
- Length: 33:58
- Label: Reprise
- Producers: Pentangle & John Wood

Pentangle chronology
Reflection (1971)	Solomon's Seal (1972)	History Book (1972)

Solomon's Seal is an album recorded in 1972 by folk-rock band Pentangle. It was the last album recorded by the original line-up, before the band split in 1973. Jacqui McShee has stated that it is her favourite Pentangle album. The album title refers to the Seal of Solomon — a mythical signet ring with magical powers, sometimes associated with the pentagram symbol adopted by Pentangle.

Solomon's Seal was recorded at Sound Techniques studio, London, between February and March 1972. Pentangle's contract with Transatlantic had expired and, amid a dispute with Transatlantic over royalties, the band had switched allegiance to Warner/Reprise, who had been their U.S. distributor. The album was released in September 1972, to coincide with the start of Pentangle's new tour. However, by the start of 1973, the band had split and sales of the album were disappointing, leaving the band members still paying off their debts, against the album's advance royalties, into the early 1980s.

The album opens with their version of Cyril Tawney's song of a sailor's lost love: "Sally Free and Easy". Unlike its usual rendition as a sea shanty, Pentangle treat this to a slow bluesy rhythm.

== Reception ==
Professional ratings
Review scores
Source	Rating
Allmusic	2.5/5 stars

Retrospective reviews generally described Solomon's Seal as a low point for Pentangle. Allmusic commented that "Ultimately, there's nothing seriously wrong with the record, other than a certain complacency and lack of the fiery inspiration and risk-taking that had fueled their greatest previous heights." They added that "none of the individual tracks would rate among their best." Colin Harper wrote "Solomon's Seal is a record of people's weariness, but also the product of a unit whose members were still among the best players, writers and musical interpreters of their day."

== Track listing ==
All songs written by Terry Cox, Bert Jansch, Jacqui McShee, John Renbourn and Danny Thompson, except where noted.

1. "Sally Free and Easy" (Cyril Tawney) – 3:55
2. "The Cherry Tree Carol" (Traditional; arranged by Jansch, Renbourn, Thompson, Cox, McShee) – 2:57
3. "The Snows" – 3:43
4. "High Germany" (Traditional; arranged by Jansch, Renbourn, Thompson, Cox, McShee) – 3:15
5. "People On the Highway" – 4:46
6. "Willy O' Winsbury" (Traditional; arranged by Jansch, Renbourn, Thompson, Cox, McShee) – 6:50
7. "No Love Is Sorrow" – 2:41
8. "Jump Baby Jump" – 3:10
9. "Lady of Carlisle" (Traditional; arranged by Jansch, Renbourn, Thompson, Cox, McShee) – 4:41

"The Snows" is listed as a Pentangle composition but is actually a traditional song, previously recorded by both Archie Fisher and Anne Briggs.

== Personnel ==
Pentangle

- Jacqui McShee – vocals (tracks 1, 2, 4, 5, 6, 7, 8, 9)
- John Renbourn – electric guitar (tracks 1, 4, 8, 9), acoustic guitar (tracks 2, 6, 9), recorder (tracks 3, 4, 6), sitar (track 3), harmonica (track 9), vocals (track 9)
- Bert Jansch – acoustic guitar (tracks 1–5, 7, 8), vocals (tracks 1, 3, 5, 7, 8), banjo (tracks 4, 9), dulcimer (track 6)
- Danny Thompson – double bass
- Terry Cox – drums (tracks 1–5, 7–9), finger cymbals (track 5), vocals (track 9)

== Release history ==
Solomon's Seal was released in 1972 in the UK as Reprise K44197 and in the US as Reprise 2100.

A digitally remastered version was released on CD in 2003, as Castle CMQCD555. This was produced from a tape owned by John Renbourn as the original masters were believed to be lost. However, the original master tapes have since been found in the U.S.A.
