= So Early in the Spring (Pentangle album) =

So Early In The Spring

Studio album by Pentangle
- Released: 1989
- Studio: Raezor Studios, Wandsworth, London
- Genre: Folk, folk rock
- Length: 44:18
- Label: Green Linnet
- Producer: Nigel Portman-Smith

Pentangle chronology
| A Maid That's Deep in Love (1988) | So Early In The Spring (1989) | Think of Tomorrow (1991) |

Professional ratings
Review scores
| Source | Rating |
|---|---|
| AllMusic | 3/5 stars |

So Early in the Spring is the ninth album by Pentangle. It was issued in 1989 in the USA on Green Linnet CS1F3048 (cassette), 51F3048 (LP) and GLCD3048 (CD). In the UK it was issued on Pläne 88648, and in 1996 on Park PRK CD 35. It was reissued in 1997 on Spindrift.

== Track listing ==
All songs are Traditional; except where indicated.

1. "Eminstra" (Rod Clements, Gerry Conway, Bert Jansch, Jacqui McShee, Nigel Portman-Smith) - 3:57
2. "So Early in the Spring" - 5:40
3. "The Blacksmith" - 3:25
4. "Reynardine" - 4:21
5. "Lucky Black Cat" (Rod Clements, Gerry Conway, Bert Jansch, Jacqui McShee, Nigel Portman-Smith) - 3:20
6. "Bramble Briar" - 5:54
7. "Lassie Gathering Nuts" - 5:02
8. "Gaea" - 4:46
9. "The Baron O' Brackley" - 7:53

== Personnel ==
Pentangle

- Rod Clements - mandolin, electric guitar
- Gerry Conway - drums, percussion
- Bert Jansch - vocals, guitar
- Jacqui McShee - vocals
- Nigel Portman Smith - keyboards, bass
- Tony Roberts - flute, whistle

Technical

- John Aycock - engineer
- Uli Hetscher - executive producer
- Peter Bucker - cover
