= Estela Beatriz Cols =

Argentine pedagogue

Prof. Estela Beatriz Cols
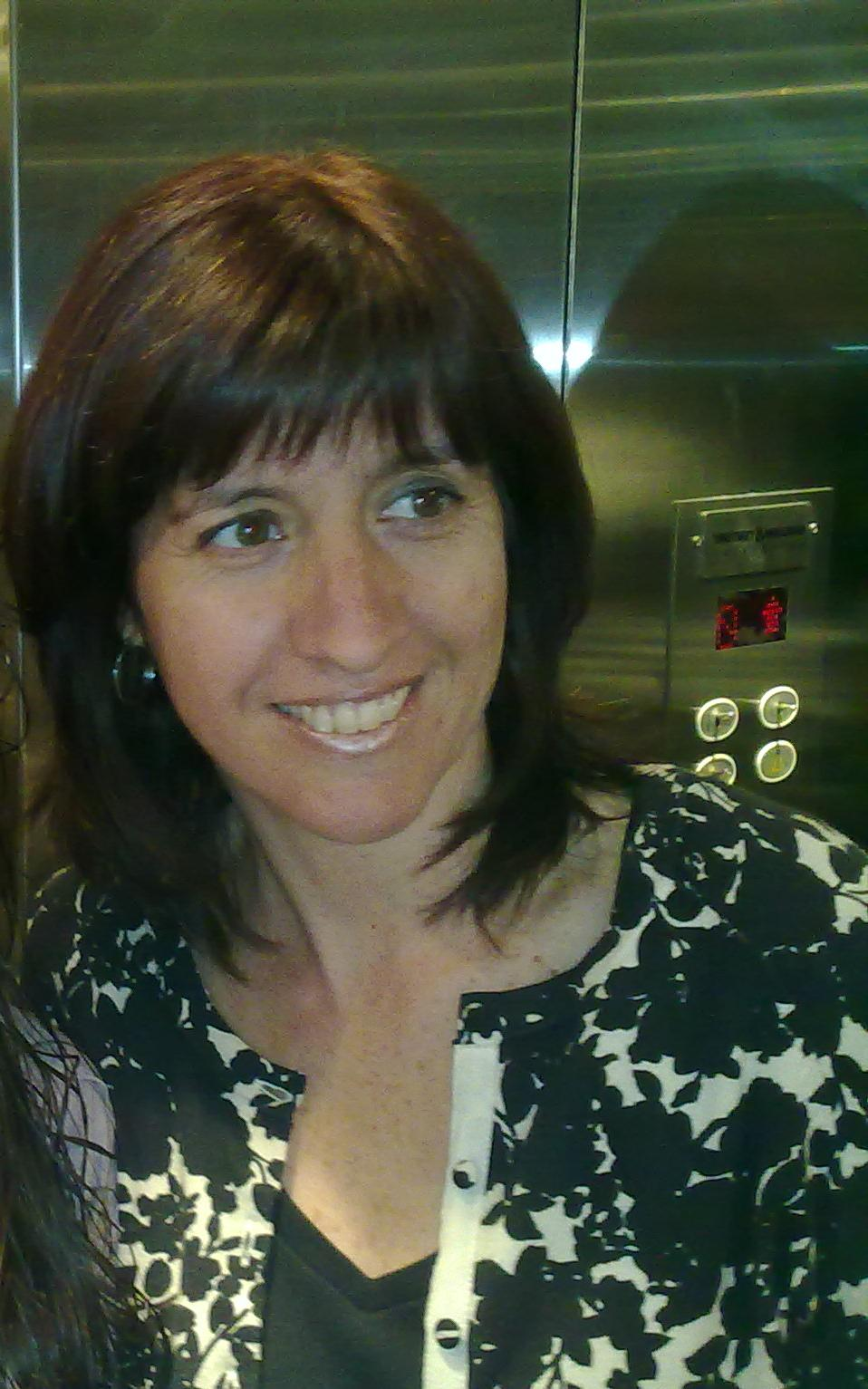
- Born: February 27, 1965; Buenos Aires, Argentina
- Died: March 27, 2010 (aged 45)
- Occupations: pedagogue; researcher; educator

Academic background
- Education: Faculty of Philosophy and Letters, University of Buenos Aires
- Thesis: Estilos de enseñanza: Sentidos personales y configuraciones de acción tras la semejanza de las palabras

Academic work
- Discipline: theoretical work in education
- Institutions: University of Buenos Aires; National University of La Plata
- Notable works: El Saber Didáctico

Estela Beatriz Cols (Buenos Aires, February 27, 1965 - March 27, 2010) was an Argentine pedagogue, researcher, and educator at the University of Buenos Aires and at the National University of La Plata. She held a Ph.D. in education from the Faculty of Philosophy and Letters of the University of Buenos Aires. In 2007, Cols, Alicia Rosalía Wigdorovitz de Camilloni, Laura Basabe, and Silvina Feeney received the first prize of the XVIII International Conference on Education for the best theoretical work in education, as co-authors of El Saber Didáctico.

== Education ==
Estela Cols completed the Teaching Staff for Primary Education program at the Escuela Normal Superior no. 4 "Estanislao Zeballos" in 1987. A year later, in 1988, she received a bachelor's degree in Education sciences from the Faculty of Philosophy and Letters, University of Buenos Aires, with a distinguished general average and honors diploma. In 2008, she obtained was awarded the Doctor of Education at the Faculty of Philosophy and Letters of the UBA. Her doctoral thesis, titled Estilos de enseñanza: Sentidos personales y configuraciones de acción tras la semejanza de las palabras (Teaching Styles: Personal Senses and Action Configurations After the Similarity of Words), was published posthumously as a book by Editorial Homo Sapiens, in 2011.

== Career ==
A CONICET research fellow between 1989 and 1994, her academic career emphasized the investigation of pedagogical-didactic change processes.

Since 1992, she worked as a professor of the Didactic I chair, under Alicia Rosalía Wigdorovitz de Camilloni, in the Faculty and Bachelor of Education areas of the Faculty of Philosophy and Letters of the University of Buenos Aires. Cols was Head of Practical Work and full professor of this same chair, although she could not formally assume the position. At this same institution, she gave graduate and postgraduate seminars on didactics, learning assessment, and research methodology. In 1999, she received an award from the Archipelago Foundation for her work Innovación educativa y proyecto curricular de centro "(Educational innovation and center curricular project). Since 2000, Cols worked as a professor at the Faculty of Humanities and Educational Sciences of the National University of La Plata. She was a professor in charge of the General Didactics Chair for Physical Education Teachers; and, from 2003, Adjunct Professor of Didactics. At this same institution, she gave graduate and postgraduate seminars on didactics, curriculum, and research in teaching.

== Selected works ==
- Amantea, Alejandra; Cappelletti, Graciela; Cols, Estela; Feeney, Silvina. (2004). Concepciones sobre curriculum, contenido escolar y el profesor en los procesos de elaboración de textos curriculares en Argentina. Archivos Analíticos de Política Educativa, 12 (40).
- Cols, Estela; Amantea, Alejandra; Basabe, Laura; Fairstein, Gabriela. (2006). La definición de propósitos y contenidos curriculares para la enseñanza de las Ciencias Naturales: tendencias actuales y perspectivas. Praxis Educativa, 10 (10).
- Basabe, Laura; Cols, Estela (2007). La enseñanza. En Alicia Camilloni, Estela Cols, Laura Basabe y Silvina Feeney. El saber didáctico (pp. 125–161). Buenos Aires, Argentina: Paidós.
- Cols, Estela (2007). Problemas de enseñanza y propuestas didácticas a través del tiempo. En Alicia Camilloni, Estela Cols, Laura Basabe y Silvina Feeney. El saber didáctico (pp. 71–124). Buenos Aires, Argentina: Paidós. El quehacer de la investigación en educación (pp. 127–141). Buenos Aires, Argentina: Manantial.
- Camilloni, Alicia; Cols, Estela (2010). La problemática de la investigación didáctica: El caso de una investigación sobre formatos de evaluación de los aprendizajes y sus relaciones con las modalidades de estudio de los alumnos universitarios. En Catalina Wainerman y María Mercedes di Virgilio (Comps.).
- Cols, Estela (2011). Estilos de enseñanza. Sentidos personales y configuraciones de acción tras la semejanza de las palabras (1a. ed.). (Enfoques y perspectivas). Rosario, Argentina: Homo Sapiens.
