= Hard Times for Lovers =

Studio album by Judy Collins
- Released: February 1979
- Genre: Folk
- Label: Elektra
- Producer: Gary Klein

Judy Collins chronology
| So Early in the Spring (1977) | Hard Times for Lovers (1979) | Running for My Life (1980) |

Professional ratings
Review scores
| Source | Rating |
|---|---|
| AllMusic | 2/5 stars |
| The Encyclopedia of Popular Music | 2/5 stars |
| The Rolling Stone Album Guide | 2.5/5 stars |

Hard Times for Lovers is the twelfth studio album by American singer and songwriter Judy Collins, released by Elektra Records in 1979.

It was Collins's first new recording since Bread and Roses, in 1976; it earned some extra publicity as a result of the back cover of the Francesco Scavullo-photographed sleeve art, depicting most of a nude Collins as seen from the back. The album was still something of a commercial disappointment, however, peaking at No. 54 on the Billboard Pop Albums charts.

== Track listing ==
1. "Hard Times for Lovers" (Hugh Prestwood) – 3:56
2. "Marie" (Randy Newman) – 3:11
3. "Happy End" (Henry Gaffney) – 3:12
4. "Desperado" (Glenn Frey, Don Henley) – 3:34
5. "I Remember Sky" (Stephen Sondheim) – 4:00
6. "Starmaker" (Bruce Roberts, Carole Bayer Sager) – 4:28
7. "Dorothy" (Hugh Prestwood) – 4:37
8. "I'll Never Say Goodbye" (Theme from the Universal Picture The Promise) (Alan Bergman, Marilyn Bergman, David Shire) – 3:41
9. "Through the Eyes of Love" (Theme from Ice Castles) (Marvin Hamlisch, Carole Bayer Sager) – 3:28
10. "Where or When" (Lorenz Hart, Richard Rodgers) – 3:38

== Personnel ==
- Judy Collins – vocals, guitar, piano
- Jeff Baxter – guitar, pedal steel
- Dennis Budimir – guitar
- Norton Buffalo – harmonica
- Gary Coleman – percussion
- Hilda Harris – background vocals
- Cissy Houston – background vocals
- David Hungate – bass
- Jim Keltner – drums
- Mike Lang – piano
- Dean Parks – guitar
- Lee Ritenour – guitar
- Maretha Stewart – background vocals
- Fred Tackett – guitar
- Jai Winding – piano, keyboards
- David Wolfert – guitar, arranger
- Frank DeCaro - music contractor, album supervisor
- Sid Sharp – strings, concertmaster
- Harry Bluestone – strings, concertmaster

== Production notes ==
- Produced by Gary Klein
- Arranged and conducted by Lee Holdridge and Nick DeCaro
- Frank DeCaro – music contractor and album supervisor
- Linda Gerrity – production coordination
- Art direction by Nancy Greenberg
- Mastered by Bernie Grundman and Zal Schreiber
- Assistant engineering by Pete Lewis, Linda Tyler, Don Henderson
- Engineer, remixing by John Mills, Armin Steiner
- Photography by Francesco Scavullo

== Charts ==
Chart performance for Hard Times for Lovers
| Chart (1979) | Peak position |
|---|---|
| Canada Top 100 Albums (RPM) | 56 |
| US Top LPs & Tape (Billboard) | 54 |
| US Top 100 Albums (Cash Box) | 45 |
| US The Album Chart (Record World) | 67 |
