= Reflection (Pentangle album) =

Studio album by Pentangle
- Released: October 1971
- Recorded: March 1971
- Studios: Command Studios and Olympic Studios, London
- Genres: Folk, folk rock
- Length: 39:34
- Label: Transatlantic
- Producer: Bill Leader

Pentangle chronology
Cruel Sister (1970)	Reflection (1971)	Solomon's Seal (1972)

Reflection is an album recorded in 1971 by folk-rock band Pentangle.

The album was recorded over a three-week period in March 1971, at a time when the tensions between the band members were high. Different band members were continually threatening to leave and attendance by Jansch and Renbourn at the recording sessions was dependent on their state of sobriety.

== Reception ==
Professional ratings
Review scores
Source	Rating
Allmusic	3.5/5 stars

Allmusic highly praised the album in their retrospective review, calling the most attention to Jansch and Renbourn's acoustic guitar duets and McShee's vocals. They singled out "Wedding Dress" ("a fabulous meeting of Celtic, country, and, believe it or not, funk") and "Will the Circle Be Unbroken" ("the group was further exploring new musical ground, this time with traditional American folk/gospel") as especially strong tracks.

== Track listing ==
All songs written by Terry Cox, Bert Jansch, Jacqui McShee, John Renbourn, and Danny Thompson, except where noted.

Side one
No.	Title	Writer(s)	Length
1.	"Wedding Dress"	Traditional	2:51
2.	"Omie Wise"	Traditional	4:23
3.	"Will the Circle Be Unbroken?"	Traditional	4:06
4.	"When I Get Home"		4:55
5.	"Rain and Snow"	Traditional	3:49

Side two
No.	Title	Length
6.	"Helping Hand"	3:27
7.	"So Clear"	4:49
8.	"Reflection"	11:14

== Release history ==
Reflection was released in 1971 in the UK as Transatlantic TRA24O. The U.S. release, also in 1971, was Reprise R56463.

== Personnel ==
Pentangle

- Terry Cox – drums, percussion, vocals
- Bert Jansch – acoustic guitar, banjo, vocals
- Jacqui McShee – vocals
- John Renbourn – acoustic guitar, electric guitar, sitar, vocals
- Danny Thompson – double bass
