= Pilar Calveiro =

Argentine political scientist

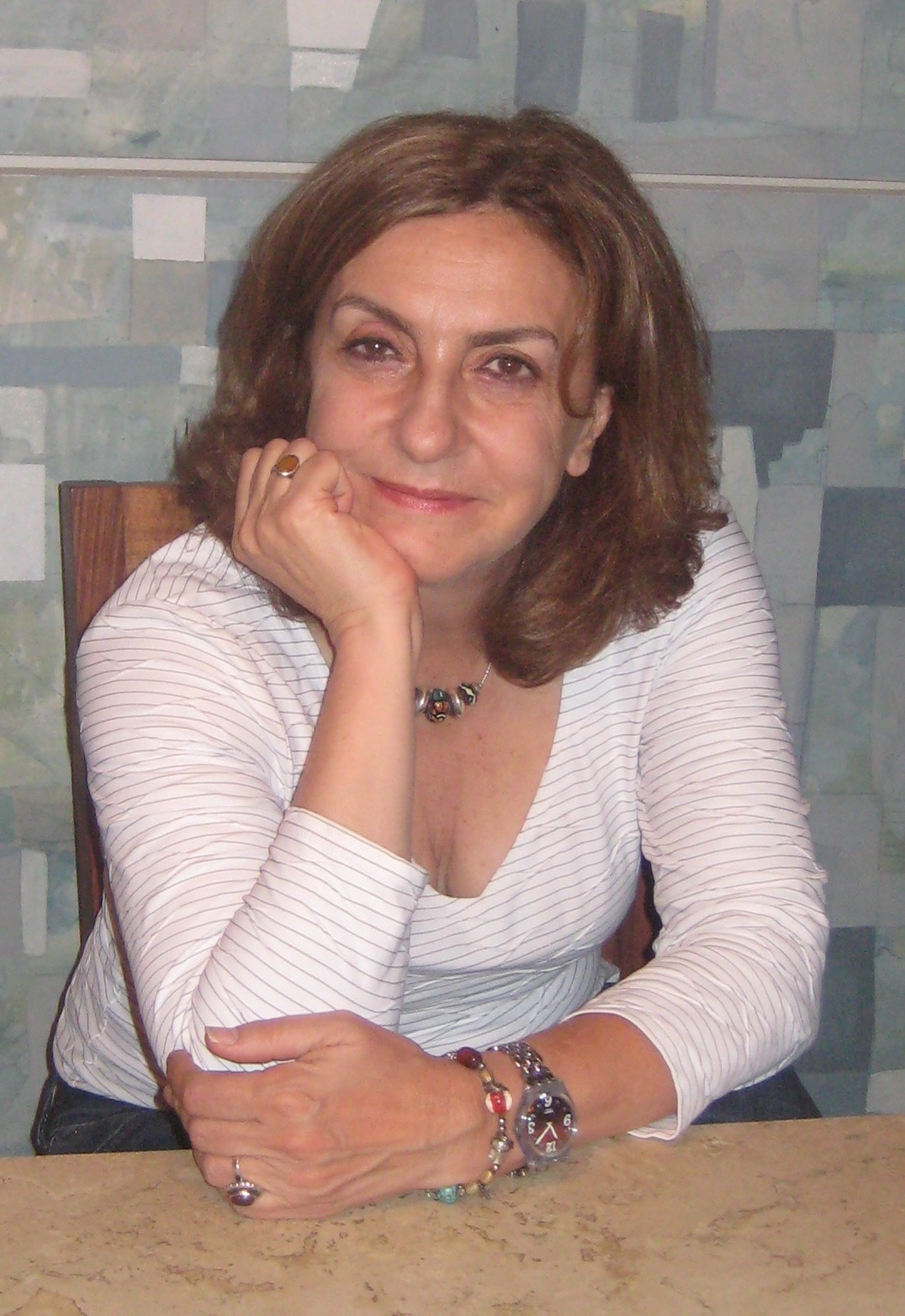
- August 2012
- Born: 7 September 1953 (age 72); Buenos Aires, Argentina
- Education: National Autonomous University of Mexico
- Occupation: Political scientist
- Spouse: Horacio Domingo Campiglia (died 1980)
- Awards: Konex Award (2014)

Pilar Calveiro (born 7 September 1953) is an Argentine political scientist, a doctor of political science residing in Mexico. She was exiled to that country after having been kidnapped at the Navy Petty-Officers School of Mechanics (ESMA) during the military dictatorship of the 1970s. In her writing she has made important contributions to the analysis of biopower and political violence, as well as recent history and the memory of Argentine repression. Her work has been published in Mexico, Argentina, and France, and she is currently a research professor at the Benemérita Universidad Autónoma de Puebla. Her publications include Poder y desaparición, los campos de concentración en Argentina and Desapariciones, memoria y desmemoria de los campos de desaparición argentinos.

== Biography ==
Pilar Calveiro was born in Buenos Aires on 7 September 1953. She studied at the Colegio Nacional de Buenos Aires and began studying sociology at the Faculty of Philosophy and Letters of the University of Buenos Aires. She was a militant of the Revolutionary Armed Forces (FAR), and later of the Montoneros.

On 7 May 1977, she was kidnapped by a member of the Air Force in the middle of the street and taken to the clandestine detention center called Mansión Seré in Ituzaingó. In a term that lasted for a year and a half, she was also detained-disappeared in the Castelar police station, the former house of Admiral Massera belonging to the Naval Information Service, and at the Navy Petty-Officers School of Mechanics (ESMA).

She went into exile in Spain in 1978, and later in Mexico, where she has lived since 1979. There she studied political science at the National Autonomous University of Mexico (UNAM), where she obtained her bachelor's degree (1986), master's degree (1995), and doctorate (2001) in that discipline.

== Poder y desaparición ==
Poder y desaparición: Los campos de concentración en Argentina (Power and Disappearance: The Concentration Camps in Argentina) is Calveiro's most referenced work. Written in the framework of her master's thesis and published for the first time in Buenos Aires in 1998, it is a work drawing on testimonies of survivors from different torture and concentration camps of the Argentine military dictatorship (1976–1983). Calveiro reflects on the political concepts that underlie these practices, interweaving her personal experience into this broader narrative. The prologue of the book was written by the poet Juan Gelman.

== Personal life ==
Pilar Calveiro became a widow in 1980, when her husband, Horacio Domingo Campiglia, was arrested in Brazil by personnel from the 601st Battalion of the Argentine Army, who moved him to Argentine territory and then "disappeared" him as another victim of Operation Condor. She is the mother of two daughters, Mercedes and María Campiglia.

In 2014 she received the Konex Award Diploma of Merit as one of Argentina's most important writers of political and sociological essays of the decade.

== Individual publications ==
- Poder y desaparición (1998). Buenos Aires: Colihue
- Redes familiares de sumisión y resistencia (2003). México: UACM
- Familia y poder (2006). Buenos Aires: Libros de la Araucaria
- Política y/o violencia. Una aproximación a la guerrilla de los años 70 (2006). Buenos Aires: Norma Editorial
- Violencias de estado. La guerra antiterrorista y la guerra contra el crimen como medios de control global. (2012). Buenos Aires: Siglo Veintiuno Editores

== Selected articles in collective works ==
- "Antiguos y nuevos sentidos de la política y la violencia", in Revista Lucha Armada 2 (4), 2006
- "Texto y memoria en el relato histórico", in Acta Poética 27 (2), Autumn 2006
- "Torture: New Methods and Meanings", translated by William Nichols and Thomas C. Hilde, in South Central Review 24 (1), Spring 2007
- "Apuntes sobre la tensión entre violencia y ética en la construcción de las memorias políticas", in Durán, Valeria/Huffschmid, Anne (Hg.) (2012). Topografías conflictivas. Memorias, espacios y ciudad en disputa. Buenos Aires: Nueva Trilce

== See also ==
- List of kidnappings
