= Francesco Scavullo =

American fashion photographer

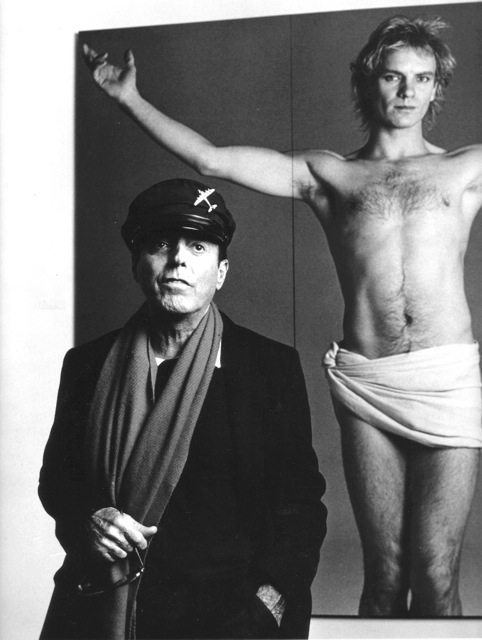
- Scavullo and his 1984 portrait of Sting
- Born: January 16, 1921; Staten Island, New York City, U.S.
- Died: January 6, 2004 (aged 82); New York City, U.S.
- Known for: Fashion photography
- Spouse: Carol McCallson (m. 1952; d. 1955)
- Partner: Sean Byrnes (1972–2004)

Francesco Scavullo (January 16, 1921 – January 6, 2004) was an American fashion photographer. He was best known for his work on the covers of Cosmopolitan from 1965 to 1995 and his celebrity portraits. Scavullo shot every cover of Cosmopolitan magazine for 33 years in addition to covers of Vogue, Rolling Stone and Town and Country, making him the most celebrated fashion photographer, with over 600 covers during his 50 year span.

Scavullo's photographs have also been used on the covers of Seventeen, Harper's Bazaar, Interview, Newsweek, and Rolling Stone. He published several books, including Scavullo on Beauty (1976), Francesco Scavullo 1948-1984 (1984), and Scavullo Nudes (2000).

== Biography ==
Scavullo was born on January 16, 1921, in the New York City borough of Staten Island. He was one of five children of Angelo and Margaret Scavullo. During his childhood, he lived in Midtown Manhattan at E 52nd Street.

He used his father's camera to photograph his sisters, who would model for him. His father wasn't impressed by his passion for photography, particularly when he blew off attending Cornell University to study hotel administration in order to pursue what he enjoyed.

In 1945, Scavullo was hired by Vogue to assist photographer Horst P. Horst, which launched his photography career. He spent three years as Horst's assistant, studying his techniques. After shooting his first magazine cover for Seventeen in 1948, he was offered a lucrative contract by the publication. Eventually, Scavullo opened his own studio in Manhattan.

Scavullo was married to model Carol McCallson from 1952 to 1955.

Good Housekeeping cover from July 1967 with photo of Alana Collins (later Alana Stewart) by Scavullo

In 1965, Helen Gurley Brown, editor-in-chief of Cosmopolitan magazine, hired Scavullo to assist in defining her new definition of femininity—the Cosmo Girl—because she thought that contemporary women could have it all.

In 1969, Scavullo photographed rock singer Janis Joplin, which he declared one of his favorite photo sessions. One of his more controversial works included a Cosmopolitan centerfold of a nude Burt Reynolds in 1972.

Scavullo was widely credited for helping to launch the careers of supermodels like Gia Carangi and Iman in the 1970s. In 1974, he shot the first cover of American Vogue with a black woman, Beverly Johnson.

Scavullo photographed Barbra Streisand and Kris Kristofferson for the movie poster for A Star is Born (1976). He was also credited with the photography for several albums, including Once Upon A Time (1977) and Live and More (1978) by Donna Summer, Hard Times for Lovers (1979) by Judy Collins, Dynasty by Kiss, and Diana (1980) by Diana Ross.

Scavullo was diagnosed as manic-depressive in 1981.

In 1981, Scavullo was commissioned by Mikhail Baryshnikov to photograph the dancers of the American Ballet Theatre, which formed the basis of an exhibition that was later shown in a nationwide tour.

Scavullo photographed Duran Duran in the 1980s, with his work featured on various releases including the cover of "The Wild Boys" single. He appeared in the band's tour documentary Sing Blue Silver.

Scavullo died on January 6, 2004 of heart failure at the age of 82 while on his way to a New York photo shoot with a then up-and-coming CNN news anchor, Anderson Cooper. Scavullo was survived by his partner and collaborator Sean Byrnes.

== Publications ==
- Scavullo on Beauty. Edited by Sean Byrnes. New York: Random House, 1976. ISBN 9780394407289
- Scavullo on Men. With Sean Byrnes and Bob Colacello. New York: Random House, 1977. ISBN 9780394419343
- Scavullo Women. With Sean Byrnes. New York: Harper and Row, 1982. ISBN 9780060148386
- Scavullo: Francesco Scavullo Photographs 1948–1984. Edited by Sean Byrnes. New York: Harper and Row, 1984. ISBN 9780060152307
- Scavullo: Photographs 50 Years. Introduction by Enid Nemy. New York: Harry N. Abrams, 1997. ISBN 9780810941809
- Scavullo Nudes. Introduction by David Leddick. Edited by Ruth A. Peltason and Judith Hudson. New York: Harry N. Abrams, 2000. ISBN 9780810941953
  - Scavullo: Nudes. München: Knesebeck, 2000. ISBN 9783896600691
  - Scavullo: Les Nus. Paris: La Martinière, 2000. ISBN 9782732426181
