= L'Hermite =

L'Hermite may refer to the following persons:

- Jacques l'Hermite, a Dutch merchant, explorer and admiral of the 17th century
- Jean-Marthe-Adrien l'Hermite, a French sea captain of the late 18th century
- François Tristan l'Hermite, a French dramatist who wrote under the name Tristan l'Hermite
- Tristan l'Hermite, a French political and military figure of the late Middle Ages

== See also ==
- Hermite (disambiguation)
- Lhermitte (disambiguation)
