= Hermite (disambiguation) =

Charles Hermite (1822–1901) was a French mathematician.

Hermite or Hermitte may also refer to:

== Hermite ==
- Hermite (crater), a lunar impact crater located in 1964, named after Charles Hermite
- Hermite constant, in mathematics
- Hermite distribution, in probability theory and statistics
- Hermite interpolation, in numerical analysis
- Hermite normal form, in linear algebra
- Hermite polynomials, a classical orthogonal polynomial sequence
  - Hermite spline, a spline curve where each polynomial of the spline is in Hermite form
- Hermite Islands, a group of Chilean islands named after the Dutch admiral Jacques l'Hermite
- Hermite, the biggest island of the Hermite Islands archipelago

== Hermitte ==
- Achille-Antoine Hermitte (1840 – c. 1870), French architect
- Enrique Hermitte (1871–1955), Argentine geologist
- Esther Hermitte (1921–1990), Argentine social anthropologist

== See also ==
- Hermit (disambiguation)
- L'Hermite (disambiguation)
- Hermitian matrix
