= The Nine Maidens =

Studio album by John Renbourn
- Released: 1985
- Genre: Folk
- Length: 36:33
- Label: Making Waves
- Producer: John Renbourn

John Renbourn chronology
Live in America (1982)	The Nine Maidens (1985)	The Three Kingdoms (1986)

Professional ratings
Review scores
Source	Rating
AllMusic	3.5/5 stars
Uncut	4/5 stars

The Nine Maidens is a 1985 album by John Renbourn. The album name refers to the Nine Maidens stone row near St Columb Major in the English county of Cornwall.

== Track listing ==
All tracks composed by John Renbourn

1. "New Nothynge" – 3:50
2. "The Fish in the Well" – 2:24
3. "Pavan d'Aragon" – 5:38
4. "Variations on My Lady Carey's Dompe" – 6:07
5. "Circle Dance" – 4:18
6. "The Nine Maidens"
  - "Clarsach" – 5:43
  - "The Nine Maidens" – 4:50
  - "The Fiddler" – 2:40
