= Hermit Island =

Hermit Island can refer to:

- Hermit Island (Antarctic)
- Hermit Island (Wisconsin)
- Hermit Island, a tiny river island in the Smoke Hole Canyon of West Virginia, USA

== See also ==
- Hermit Islands, Papua New Guinea
- Hermite Islands, Tierra del Fuego
- Hermite Island, one of the Montebello Islands, Australia
