= Cruel Sister (Pentangle album) =

Studio album by Pentangle
- Released: 27 November 1970
- Recorded: 1970
- Studio: Sound Techniques, London
- Genre: Folk, folk rock
- Length: 37:35
- Label: Transatlantic
- Producer: Bill Leader

Pentangle chronology
Basket of Light (1969)	Cruel Sister (1970)	Reflection (1971)

Cruel Sister is an album recorded in 1970 by folk-rock band Pentangle. It was the most folk-based of the albums recorded by the band, with all the tracks being versions of traditional songs. Whereas their previous album had been produced by Shel Talmy, and featured quite a heavily produced, commercial sound, Cruel Sister was produced by Bill Leader, noted for his recordings of folk musicians.

"Lord Franklin" is a version of the traditional ballad, also known as "Lady Franklin's Lament", which describes Sir John Franklin's ill-fated expedition to discover the Northwest Passage. John Renbourn sings the lead vocal and plays both acoustic and electric guitar.

"Cruel Sister", the song which provides the title for the album, is a traditional ballad (known in some versions as The Twa Sisters), telling the story of the violent rivalry between two sisters for the love of a knight.

The whole of side two of the album is taken up with an extended version of the ballad "Jack Orion", previously recorded by Jansch on his own Jack Orion album. "Jack Orion" is a version of the Child ballad "Glasgerion". The arrangement on Cruel Sister develops through several sections with different rhythms and instrumentation.

The album cover features engravings by Albrecht Dürer. The front cover displays his "The Men's Bath" (Das Männerbad) (c. 1496). The picture on the back cover is his The Sea Monster (Das Meerwunder), dating from 1498.

== Reception ==
Professional ratings
Review scores
Source	Rating
AllMusic	4.5/5 stars
Christgau's Record Guide	C+

AllMusic gave the album resounding approval in their retrospective review, applauding its "dense, layered sound that is woven within the fabric of each song like a tapestry" and praising Jacqui McShee's vocal work in particular. While they criticized the track "Jack Orion", commenting "one has difficulty imagining what possessed Pentangle to record a folk song that took up an entire side of an album", they concluded that the album as a whole "shows Pentangle at their artistic height".

== Tracks ==
All songs are public domain and arranged by Bert Jansch, John Renbourn, Terry Cox, Danny Thompson, and Jacqui McShee, except where noted.

Side one
No.	Title	Writer(s)	Lead vocals	Length
1.	"A Maid That's Deep In Love"		McShee	5:30
2.	"When I Was In My Prime"	Traditional	McShee	2:57
3.	"Lord Franklin"	arranged by Jansch, McShee, Renbourn	Renbourn	3:27
4.	"Cruel Sister"		McShee	7:03

Side two
No.	Title	Lead vocals	Length
5.	"Jack Orion"	Jansch, Renbourn and McShee	18:38

== Personnel ==
Pentangle

- Terry Cox – drums (4, 5), triangle (1), tambourine (5), dulcitone (4, 5), vocals (4)
- Bert Jansch – acoustic guitar (4, 5), dulcimer (1), concertina (3), recorder (5), vocals (4, 5)
- Jacqui McShee – vocals (all tracks)
- John Renbourn – acoustic and electric guitars (1, 3, 5), sitar (4), recorder (5), vocals (3, 4, 5)
- Danny Thompson – double bass (1, 4, 5)

== Released versions ==
Cruel Sister was released as a UK LP on 27 November 1970, as Transatlantic TRA228. The U.S. release was Reprise RS6430. In 1977, it was re-released on the XTRA label as Xtra 1172. A CD version (sourced from vinyl) was released in 1988 as Line TACD900S and in 2001, a digitally remastered version was released as Castle CMRCD206.
