= Faculty of Philosophy and Letters, University of Buenos Aires =

Faculty of Philosophy and Letters
- Facultad de Filosofía y Letras
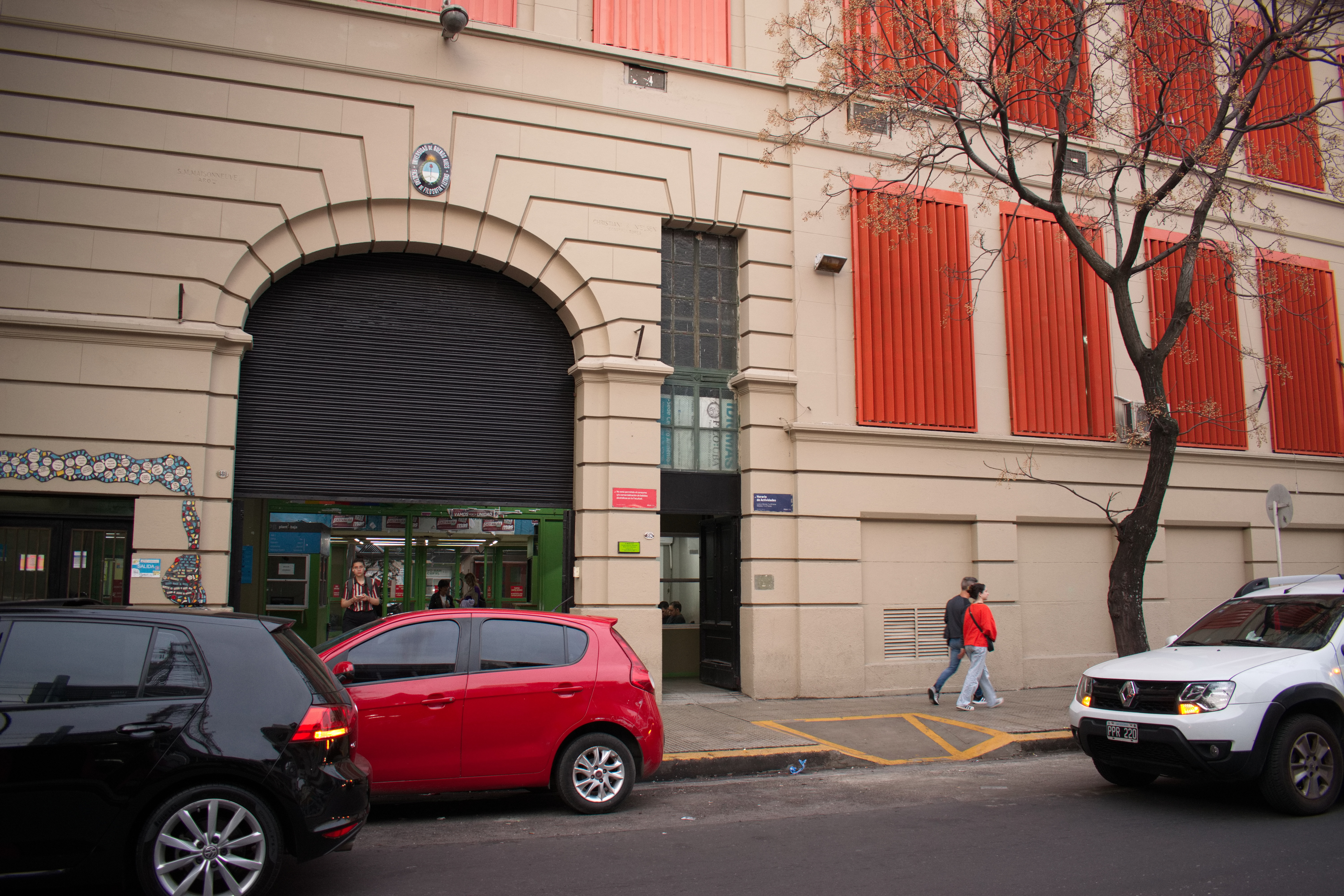
- Type: Faculty
- Established: 1896; 130 years ago
- Affiliation: University of Buenos Aires
- Dean: Ricardo Manetti
- Students: 15,289 (2011)
- Address: Puán 480, Buenos Aires, Argentina; 34.3742°S 58.2648°W
- Website: filo.uba.ar
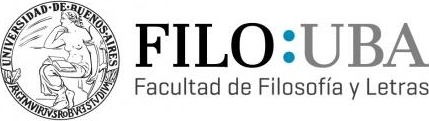

The Faculty of Philosophy and Letters (Spanish: Facultad de Filosofía y Letras; FFyL), also known as Filo, is a faculty of the University of Buenos Aires (UBA). The faculty was founded in 1896, making it one of the oldest faculties at the university. It offers graduate degrees in multiple subjects including philosophy, literature, anthropology, history, arts, education, geography, modern and classical languages, and literary editing, as well as post-graduate degrees at the magister, doctoral, and post-doctoral level.

== History ==
The UBA Superior Council mandated the creation of a faculty of philosophy and letters on 3 March 1888, but the corresponding presidential decree was only released twelve years later, on 13 February 1896, by issue of President José Evaristo Uriburu. In that same decree, Uriburu appointed Bartolomé Mitre, Bernardo de Irigoyen, Carlos Pellegrini, Rafael Obligado, Paul Groussac, Ricardo Gutiérrez, Lorenzo Anadón and Joaquín V. González as the faculty's new authorities.

Despite being one of the oldest faculties, FFyL has historically been relegated infrastructure-wise. It originally had its seat on the rectorship building, on Viamonte 430—originally the private residence of engineer Emilio Agrelo, built in 1891. It wasn't until 1962 that the faculty was granted a seat of its own, a building on Avenida Independencia 3065, in the Buenos Aires neighborhood of Balvanera. The building had originally been built as a nursing home by the Dominican Order. Following the creation of the faculties of Psychology and of Social Sciences, both as splinters from FFyL, the faculty was relocated to a building on Puán 480, in Caballito. The building formerly housed the Nobleza Piccardo tobacco factory. Said building remains the faculty's seat to this day.

== Degrees ==
- Licenciatura on the Arts
- Licenciatura on Librarianship and information science
- Licenciatura on Anthropological sciences
- Licenciatura on Education sciences
- Licenciatura on Literary editing
- Licenciatura on Philosophy
- Licenciatura on Geography
- Licenciatura on History
- Licenciatura on Letters
- Licenciatura on Classical languages and literature
- Licenciatura on Modern languages

In addition, FFyL offers professorship degrees on arts, anthropology, education sciences, philosophy, geography, history, and letters. Moreover, the faculty offers a number of specialization degrees, as well as magister degrees, doctorates and post-doctoral degrees.

== Research institutes and dependencies ==
FFyL dependencies
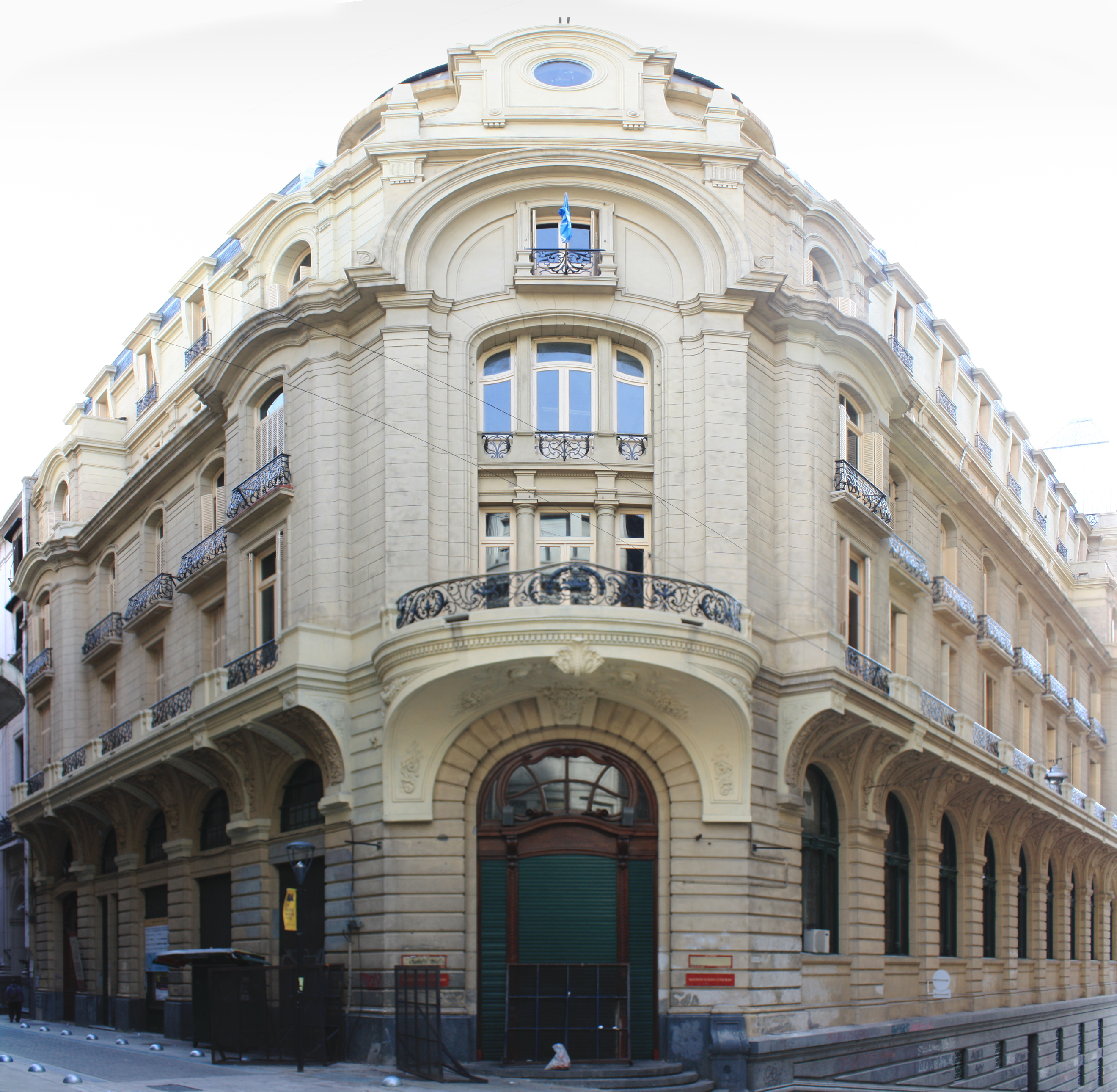
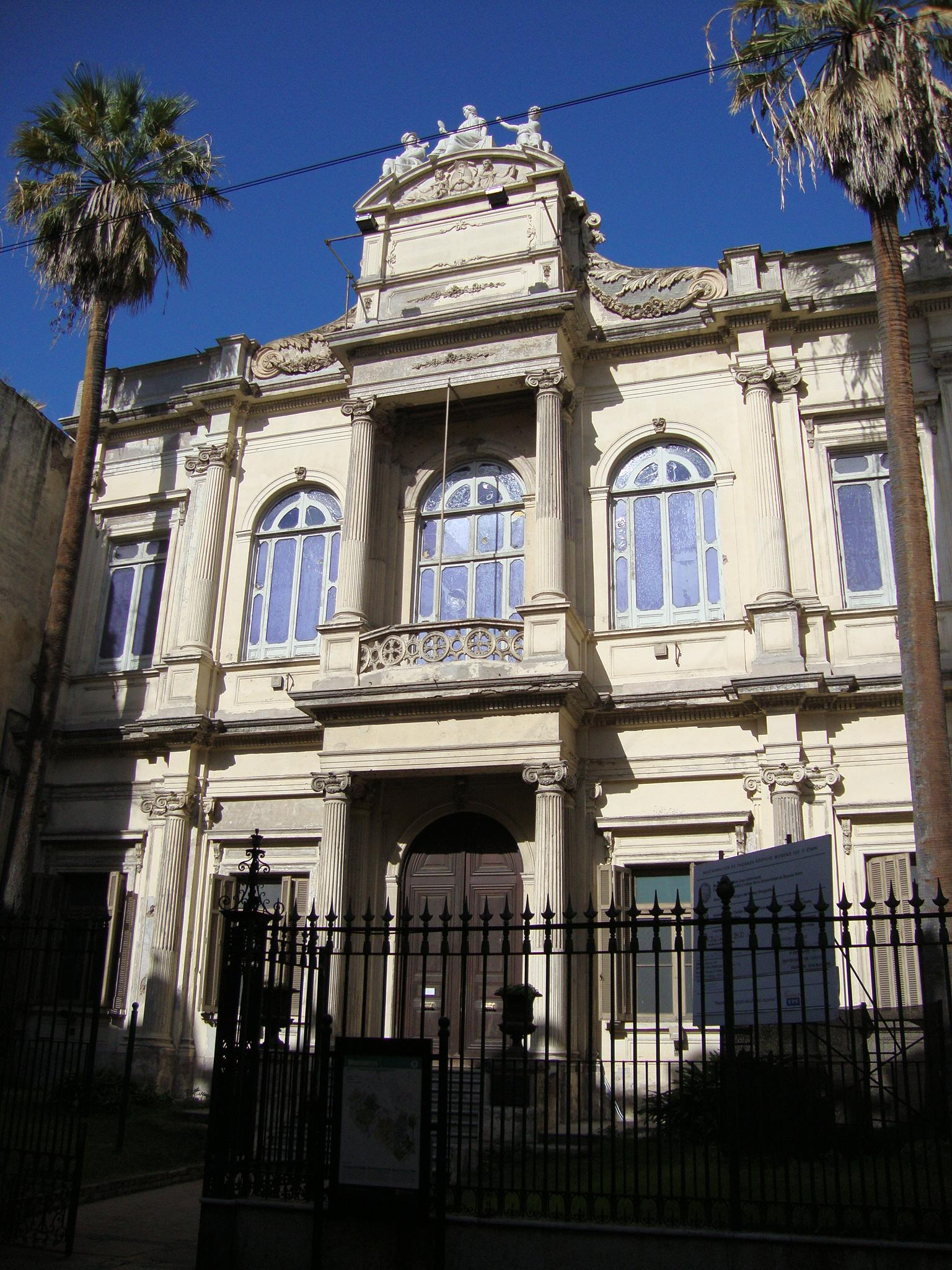
FFyL seat at 25 de Mayo St. (left) and Juan B. Ambrosetti Museum of Ethnography (right).

The Faculty of Economic Sciences counts with up to twenty-two research institutes covering diverse fields, such as the Instituto de Historia Argentina y Americana "Dr. Emilio Ravignani", one of the most renown and prestigious institutes of American and Argentine history. There are FFyL-affiliated institutes studying archaeology, anthropology, education sciences, philosophy and philology, linguistics, art history and theory, ancient history, Eastern history, Argentine, Spanish and Latin American literature, among others. Most of these institutes have their seat at the 25 de Mayo building, which previously housed the Palace Hotel.

In addition, FFyL also oversees the Juan B. Ambrosetti Museum of Ethnography, one of the university's 16 museums. It was declared a site of interest in the City of Buenos Aires by the City Legislature.

== Political and institutional life ==
Like the rest of the University of Buenos Aires's faculties, FFyL operates under the principle of tripartite co-governance, wherein authorities are democratically elected and professors, students and graduates are represented in the faculty's governing bodies. The faculty is headed by a Dean (Spanish: decano or decana), who presides over the Directive Council (Consejo Directivo). The Directive Council is made up of eight representatives for the professors, four representatives of the student body, and four representatives of the faculty's graduates. Deans are elected by the Directive Council every four years, while elections to the council take place every two years.

Since 2022, the dean of the Faculty of Philosophy and Letters has been Ricardo Manetti, with Graciela Morgade as vice dean.

== Notable people ==
The Faculty of Philosophy and Letters has produced a number of important thinkers and researchers in the fields of social science and philosophy. Social anthropologist Esther Hermitte, credited with introducing structural-functionalist anthropology in Argentina, was a FFyL alumna, as was post-marxist theorist Ernesto Laclau. Sociologist and political activist Pilar Calveiro began her studies at the Faculty of Philosophy and Letters, before the creation of the Faculty of Social Sciences in 1988. In 2008, Estela Beatriz Cols, pedagogue, researcher, and educator, received her Ph.D. in Education from this faculty.

Several renown writers and artists have also been educated at FFyL, including novelist and short story writer Julio Cortázar, one of the founders of the Latin American Boom. Cortázar began a philosophy degree aged 18, but did not complete it due to financial woes. The poet and critic Jorge Fondebrider studied literature at FFyL, and later served as director of the UBA-owned Centro Cultural Ricardo Rojas. The Manipulated Man author Esther Vilar, and the poet and translator Alejandra Pizarnik, also attended FFyL. The short story writer Samanta Schweblin studied film design at UBA. Elena Presser also began her studies at the University of Buenos Aires, as did film director Juan Cabral.
