= R. Radhakrishnan (literary critic) =

Indian writer (born 1949)

Rajagopalan Radhakrishnan (commonly known as R. Radhakrishnan, born 1949) is Distinguished Professor of English and Comparative Literature at the University of California, Irvine, in California, United States. He is a postcolonial theorist and literary critic.

Radhakrishnan earned his PhD in 1983 from Binghamton University. He moved to UC Irvine from the University of Massachusetts Amherst in the 2004–2005 academic year.

Radhakrishnan is the 2020 winner of the Distinguished Achievement Award for Outstanding Scholarship of the South Asian Literary Association.

== Selected works ==
- A Tamil prose reader: selections from contemporary Tamil prose (compiled with R. E. Asher, 1971)
- Diasporic Mediations: Between Home and Location (1996)
- Theory in an Uneven World (2003)
- Between Identity and Location: The Cultural Politics of Theory (2007)
- Transnational South Asians: The Making of a Neo-diaspora (edited with Susan Koshy, 2008)
- History, the Human, and the World Between (2008)
- Theory after Derrida: Essays in Critical Praxis (edited with Kailash C. Baral, 2009; 2nd ed., 2018)
- A Said Dictionary (2012)
