= The Hermit (album) =

Studio album by John Renbourn
- Released: 1976
- Recorded: 1976
- Genre: Folk, folk rock
- Length: 36:10
- Label: Transatlantic (U.K.)

John Renbourn chronology
Heads and Tails (1973)	The Hermit (1976)	The Black Balloon (1979)

Professional ratings
Review scores
Source	Rating
Allmusic	3/5 stars

The Hermit is the 1976 solo album by British folk musician John Renbourn. On this release, Renbourn drew from lute and harp sources, and pieces from Turlough O'Carolan such as O'Carolan's Concerto transcribed for guitar.

The Lamentation Of Owen Roe O'Neill is featured in Francis O'Neill's Music of Ireland from 1903.

Lord Inchiquin was collected in Edward Bunting's manuscripts currently residing at Queen's University Belfast.

Mrs Power is said to have been written by O'Carolan during a virtuosity competition between him and the Italian violinist Francesco Geminiani while both of them may have been invited by an Irish nobleman, Lord Mayo.

A Toye comes from the 1603 tutor Schoole of Musicke by Thomas Robinson.

Lord Willoughby's Welcome Home is an Elizabethan piece. There are versions for solo lute by Thomas Robinson and Nicolas Vallet and by John Dowland with the second part of an anonymous composer, and an arrangement named Rowland by William Byrd in the Fitzwilliam Virginal Book. It seems that this piece was made popular by William Kempe and his musicians who accompanied Robert Dudley, 1st Earl of Leicester, in Holland. When Leicester was in disgrace and revoked, Lord Willoughby succeeded him, and Kempe, hoping to find a new employer, renamed the song in his honor.

== Track listing ==
=== Side A ===
1. "The Hermit"
2. "John's Tune" (loosely based on John James's "Head in the Clouds")
3. "Little Alice" (a.k.a. "Goat Island" on U.S. release)
4. "Old Mac Bladgitt"
5. "Faro's Rag"
6. "Caroline's Tune" (Dominique Trépeau)

=== Side B ===
1. Three Pieces By O'Carolan
  - "The Lamentation of Owen Roe O'Neill"
  - "Lord Inchiquin"
  - "Mrs. Power (O'Carolan's Concerto)"
2. "The Princess and the Puddings"
3. "Pavanna (Anna Bannana)"
4. Medley
  - "A Toye"
  - "Lord Willoughby's Welcome Home"

Castle Music edition (2004 Remaster)
No.	Title	Length
9.	"The Bicycle Tune" (unreleased on UK 1976 album)
12.	"Luckett Sunday" (1977 bonus track)
13.	"New Nothynge" (duet with John James, 1985 bonus track)
14.	"Luke's Little Summer" (1977 bonus track)
15.	"Minuet In D Minor" (duet with Stefan Grossman, 1986 bonus track)
16.	"From The Bridge" (duet with John James, 1977 bonus track)

Strange Days Records (Japanese 2005 reissue)
No.	Title	Length
9.	"The Bicycle Tune" (unreleased on UK 1976 album)
12.	"Luke's Little Summer" (bonus track)
13.	"Ruckett Sunday" (bonus track)
14.	"Minuet In D Minor" (bonus track)
15.	"New Nothynge" (bonus track)
16.	"From The Bridge" (bonus track)

== Personnel ==
- John Renbourn - guitar
- John James - guitar
- Dominique Trépeau - guitar (duet on "Caroline's Tune")

=== Other ===
- Art director: Bob Franks
- Cover artwork: Paul Ellis
- Design: Paul Chave
