= Traveller's Prayer (album) =

Studio album by John Renbourn
- Released: 1998
- Genre: Folk
- Length: 52:28
- Label: Shanachie
- Producer: John Renbourn

John Renbourn chronology
Pentangle on Air (1997)	Traveller's Prayer (1998)

Traveller's Prayer is an album by John Renbourn, released in 1998. It was recorded in Dublin.

== Critical reception ==
Professional ratings
Review scores
Source	Rating
AllMusic	4/5 stars
The Encyclopedia of Popular Music	3/5 stars

The Birmingham Evening Mail deemed the album "pleasant if you're just curious, paradise if you're a folkie or guitar buff."

== Track listing ==
1. "Bunyan's Hymn (Monks Gate)" – 3:11
2. "When the Wind Blows" – 6:17
3. "Wexford Lullaby" – 4:37
4. "I Saw Three Ships/Newgate Hornpipe" – 7:39
5. "Planxty Llanthony/Loftus Jones" – 5:36
6. "Fagottanz" – 4:02
7. "At the Break of Day" – 3:49
8. "Traveller's Prayer" – 2:45
9. "South Wind/Feathered Nest" – 9:14
10. "Estampie" – 5:15

Tracks 3 & 8, unusually, do not include Renbourn, but are a cappella songs by Maighread Ní Dhomhnaill and the Voice Squad
