= Esther Hermitte =

Argentine anthropologist

María Esther Álvarez de Hermitte (1921-1990), commonly known as Esther Hermitte, was a social anthropologist from Argentina.

== Early life and education ==
Hermitte studied at the Faculty of Philosophy and Letters of the University of Buenos Aires. She completed a bachelor's degree in history and later specialized in social anthropology. After that she won a scholarship from the National Scientific and Technical Research Council, which was directed by Bernardo Houssay.

== Field work ==
In 1958 Hermitte moved to the University of Chicago in the United States, where she assisted with the social systems courses. The following year she was sent to Mexico together with linguist R. Radhakrishnan and interpreter Alberto Méndez Tobilla to conduct field work with the Mayan community of Pinola, Villa Las Rosas in the state of Chiapas. As a result of several years of work and subsequent analysis of "Social mobility in a bicultural community in Chiapas" and "Supernatural power and social control", Hermitte received a Master of Arts in 1965 and Philosophical Doctor in 1964. She received the Roy D. Albert Prize for her master thesis and the Bobbs Merryl Award for her doctoral thesis.

== Publications ==
- Diario de campo, 2 vols. Inéd 1960-1.
- Movilidad Social en una comunidad bicultural, Revista Latinoamericana de Sociología, Centro de Investanciones Sociales del Instituto Torcuato Di Tella, Buenos Aires, 1968.
- Poder sobrenatural y control social: en un pueblo maya contemporáneo, Instituto Indigenista Interamericano, México, 1970.
- El concepto de nahual en Pinola, México, en Ensayos antropológicos en los Altos de Chiapas. McQuown & Pitt-Rivers comps., Instituto Indigenista Interamericano, México, 1989.
