= The Hermit (band) =

Canadian electronica band

- Origin: Vancouver, British Columbia, Canada
- Genre: electronica
- Years active: 2000–present
- Members: Hamish Thomson

The Hermit is a Canadian electronica group started by Hamish Thomson. Based in Vancouver, the group initially consisted solely of Thomson but has come to include other musicians, notably singer Allison Shevernoha. The Hermit is known for its uplifting sound and down-to-earth drum beats.

== History ==
Hamish Thomson began his career in music as a drummer, initially working with a pipe band in Vancouver. He completed two years in the Capilano College Music Program, going on to form the Vancouver-based trio Big Tall Garden. Since then Thomson has worked as a drummer in a variety of bands including Vancouver's The Simples. In 2000, Thomson decided he needed more control over his musical creativity and formed the one-man group The Hermit. The Hermit's first album Flying out of Solitude was produced and released independently in 2001.

Working with engineer Mike Rogerson, Thomson wrote and recorded the ten tracks by himself, playing all the instruments and even using some unusual objects to make his music like a toaster oven. The album is mainly instrumental consisting of spacey synths which are grounded by Thomson's drum beats, which he emphasizes are made with a real kit. The album was described as "a wonderful little gem of a first album...a minor masterpiece at best, but it’s still a masterpiece" by PopMatters.

After the release of Flying out of Solitude, The Hermit was signed by Nettwerk, a Vancouver-based record label that has released albums by other notable Canadian acts such as Ron Sexsmith and Sarah McLachlan. Nettwerk re-released Flying out of Solitude which helped lead to The Hermit receiving the nomination for Best Independent Release at the West Coast Music Awards, and then for Male Artist of the Year and Best Electronic Release the following year. For The Hermit's second album, Wonderment, Thomson decided to expand the scope of his band to feature a variety of musicians. While still relying largely on loops for many of the instruments, a number of guest vocalists appear on the album. This marked the first time that Allison Shevernoha, who sings on the tracks "Flutterbye" and "Sir Real", was featured on The Hermit roster.

After releasing Wonderment The Hermit went on tour featuring Thomson on drums, Jon Frederiksen on bass, Robb Mitchell on keyboard, and Allison Shevernoha on vocals. The band toured across Canada as well as playing one show in Seattle. Upon returning home The Hermit continued performing, and had the opportunity to play shows with more prominent acts like Canadian indie rockers Apostle of Hustle and New York's Ivy.

Wonderment landed The Hermit a lot more recognition than Thomson's solo debut. The video for the track "Sir Real" reached the number one spot on Bravo's Top 30 Video Countdown. Also, at the Canadian Music Week's Indie Awards, The Hermit beat out better-known Canadian electronica acts the Junior Boys and Caribou, to be voted Favourite Electronica Artist. The album drew comparisons with Air.

For The Hermit's third release, 2007's Turn Up (the Stereo), which was released independently, Thomson and Shevernoha worked together much more closely, with the two co-writing eight of the ten tracks. The album also brought other changes for the band; Thomson, having produced both previous albums, worked with Krish Sharma to produce Turn Up. As well, for the first time The Hermit recorded a number of tracks live-off-the-floor instead of using looped tracks for most of the instruments.

Hamish Thomson is currently working as a drum instructor at Deep Cove Music in Vancouver. He also does session drumming and producing, as well as still playing shows with The Hermit.

== Band members ==
Flying Out of Solitude was a solo effort by Hamish Thomson, who played all the instruments on the album.

For The Hermit's second album Wonderment Thomson collaborated with a variety of vocalists including Martina Sorbara of the Britain-based electropop group Dragonette, Allison Shevernoha of the Winnipeg indie pop band Paper Moon, C.R. Avery of the Vancouver-based spoken word group Tons of Fun University, Frazey Ford of the folky Vancouver band The Be Good Tanyas, Amalia Townsend of the jazz group Sekoya, and Shelley Campbell.

The Hermit is currently composed of Hamish Thomson on drums, Robb Mitchell on keyboard, Jon Frederiksen on bass, and Duane Murrin on guitar.

== Influences ==
The Hermit describes its influences as "the world around" them. Thomson has cited other key influences as U2, Brian Eno, Kate Bush, Bob Marley, and The Police.

== Discography ==
- Flying Out of Solitude (2001)
- Wonderment (2005, Nettwerk)
- Turn Up (the Stereo) (2007)
