= My Bonny Boy =

Traditional English song

My Bonny Boy is an English folk song (Roud #293) which is featured as the second movement of Ralph Vaughan Williams English Folk Song Suite.

Joan Baez recorded a version under the title "I once loved a boy" for her album Joan Baez, Vol. 2 in 1961, which was only released on the expanded edition in 2001. Her lyrics deviate from those given below.

== Lyrics ==
There exist many variants of the lyrics. The following version was collected from George Blake, Bitterne, Southampton, Hants, in May 1906:

I once loved a boy and a bonny bonny boy,
I loved him I vow and protest,
I loved him so well, there's no tongue can tell,
Till I built him a berth on my breast.

'Twas up the wild forest and through the green groves
Like one that was troubled in mind,
I hallooed, I whooped and I blew on my flute
But no bonny boy could I find.

I looked up high and I looked down low
The weather being wonderful warm;
And who should I spy but my own bonny boy
Locked fast in another girl's arms.

He took me upon his assembled knees
And looked me quite hard in the face,
He gave unto me one sweet smile and a kiss
But his heart's in another girl's breast.

Now my bonny, bonny boy is across the salt seas
And I hope he will safely return;
But if he loves another girl better than me
Let him take her, and why should I mourn?

Now the girl that enjoys my own bonny boy,
She is not to be blamed, I am sure,
For many's the long night he have robbed me of my rest
But he never shall do it no more.
