= Pentangle (band) =

British folk rock band

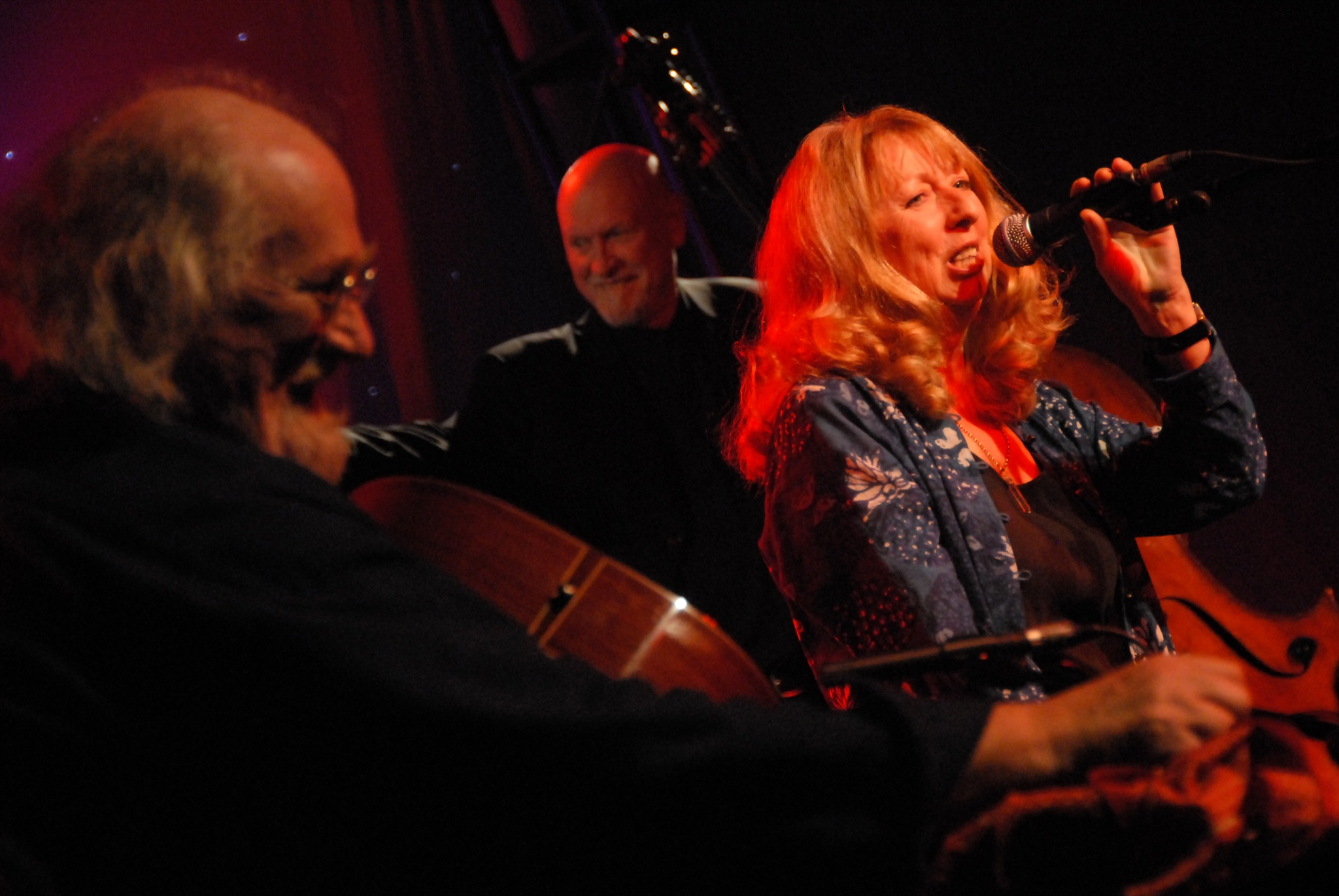
- Pentangle performing in 2007

Background information
- Also known as: The Pentangle
- Origin: London, England
- Genres: Folk rock; baroque rock; folk jazz
- Years active: 1967–1973; 1981–present
- Labels: Transatlantic; Warner Bros.; Reprise
- Spinoffs: Jacqui McShee's Pentangle
- Members: Jacqui McShee; Spencer Cozens; Alan Thomson; Gary Foote; Pascal Consoli
- Past members: Bert Jansch; Terry Cox; Danny Thompson; John Renbourn; Mike Piggott; Nigel Portman Smith; Rod Clements; Peter Kirtley; Jerry Underwood; Gerry Conway

Pentangle are a British folk rock band, formed in London in 1967. The original band was active in the late 1960s and early 1970s, and a later version has been active since the early 1980s. The original line-up, which was unchanged throughout the band's first incarnation (1967–1973), was Jacqui McShee (vocals); John Renbourn (vocals and guitar); Bert Jansch (vocals and guitar); Danny Thompson (double bass); and Terry Cox (drums).

The name Pentangle was chosen to represent the five members of the band. It was also the device on Sir Gawain's shield in the Middle English poem Sir Gawain and the Green Knight, which held a fascination for Renbourn.

In 2007, the original members of the band were reunited to receive a Lifetime Achievement award at the BBC Radio 2 Folk Awards and to record a short concert that was broadcast on BBC radio. The following June, all five original members began a twelve-date UK tour.

== History ==
=== Formation ===
The original group formed in 1967. Renbourn and Jansch, who shared a house in London in St John's Wood, were already musicians on the British folk scene, with several solo albums each and a duet LP, Bert and John.

Jacqui McShee had begun as an unpaid floor singer in several London folk clubs. By 1965 she was running a folk club at the Red Lion in Sutton, Surrey, and established a friendship with Jansch and Renbourn when they played there. She sang on Renbourn's Another Monday album and performed with him as a duo, debuting at Les Cousins club in August 1966.

Thompson and Cox were jazz musicians and had played together in Alexis Korner's band. By 1966, they were both part of Duffy Power's Nucleus, a band which also included John McLaughlin on electric guitar. Thompson was known to Renbourn through appearances at Les Cousins and from having worked with him on a project for television.

In 1967, the Scottish entrepreneur Bruce Dunnet, who had recently organised a tour for Jansch, set up a Sunday night club for Jansch and Renbourn at the now defunct Horseshoe Hotel in Tottenham Court Road, London. McShee began joining them as a vocalist, and by March of that year, Thompson and Cox were being billed as part of the band. Renbourn claims to have been the catalyst that brought the band together, although he credits Jansch with the idea of getting the band to play in a regular place, "to knock it into shape".

While Pentangle was nominally a folk group, the individual members had wide musical tastes and influences. McShee had a grounding in traditional music, Cox and Thompson a love of jazz, Renbourn a growing interest in early music, and Jansch a taste for blues and contemporary performers such as Bob Dylan.

=== Commercial success ===
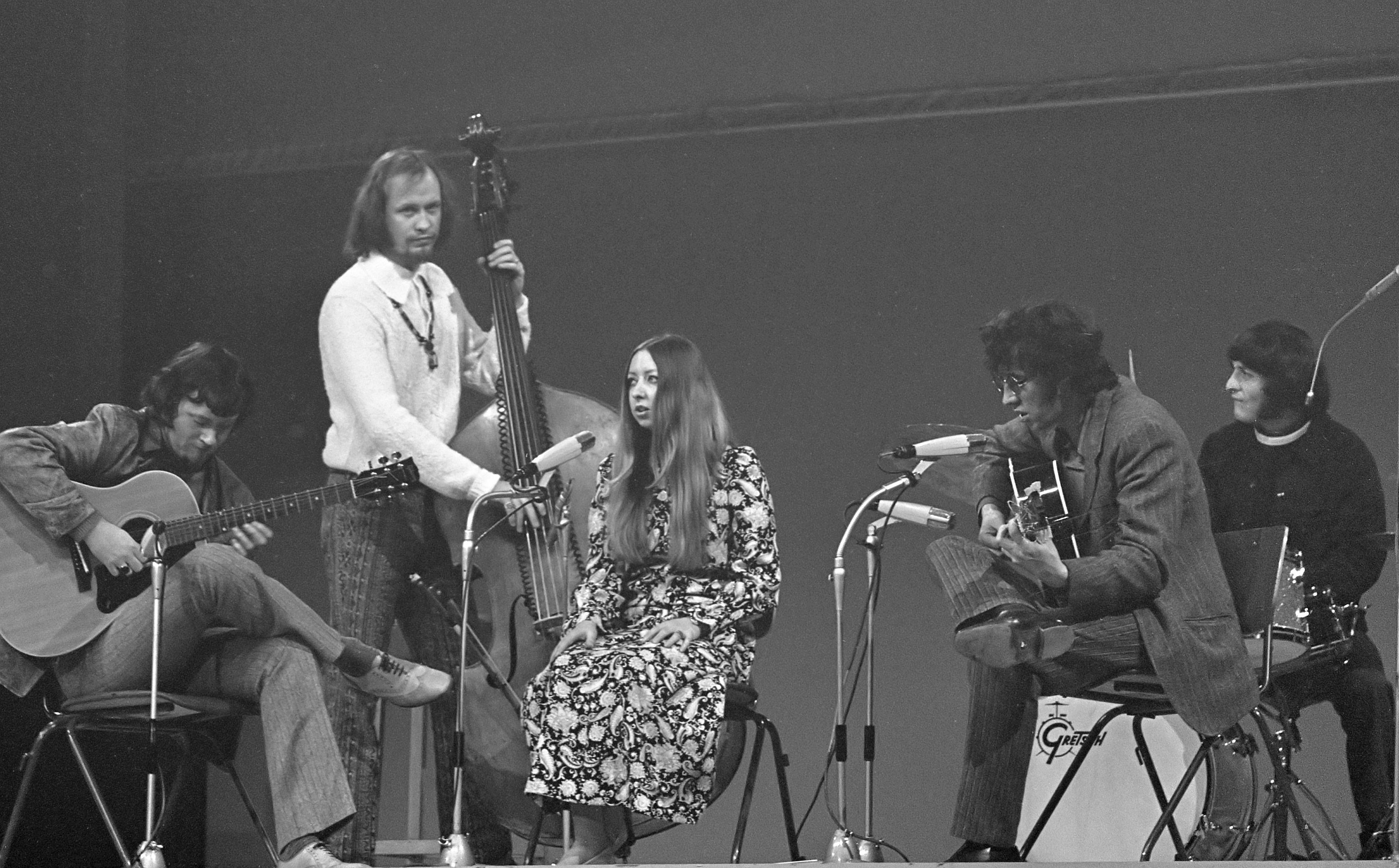
Pentangle in Amsterdam, 1969

Pentangle's first public concert was a sell-out performance at the Royal Festival Hall in London on 27 May 1967. Later that year they undertook a short tour of Denmark, in which they were disastrously billed as a rock'n'roll band, and a short UK tour organised by Nathan Joseph of Transatlantic Records. By this stage, their association with Bruce Dunnett had ended, and early in 1968 they acquired a new manager, Jo Lustig. Under his influence, they graduated from performing in clubs to appearing in concert halls, and from then on, as Colin Harper put it, "the ramshackle, happy-go-lucky progress of the Pentangle was going to be a streamlined machine of purpose and efficiency".

Pentangle signed with Transatlantic Records and their self-named debut LP was released in May 1968. This all-acoustic album was produced by Shel Talmy, who claimed to have used an innovative approach to recording acoustic guitars in order to achieve a bright, bell-like sound. On 29 June of that year, the band performed at London's Royal Festival Hall, and recordings from that concert formed part of their second album, Sweet Child (released in November 1968), a double LP comprising live and studio recordings.

Basket of Light, which followed in mid-1969, was their greatest commercial success, thanks to a surprise hit single, "Light Flight", which became popular when it was used as theme music for a television series, Take Three Girls (the BBC's first drama series to be broadcast in colour, for which the band also provided incidental music). The album reached number five in the charts. By 1970, Pentangle were at the peak of their popularity. They recorded a soundtrack for the film Tam Lin, made at least 12 television appearances, and undertook tours of the UK, including the Isle of Wight Festival, and America, including a concert at the Carnegie Hall. Their fourth album, Cruel Sister, released in October 1970, was an album of traditional songs that included a nearly 19-minute-long version of "Jack Orion", a song that Jansch and Renbourn had recorded previously as a duo. Cruel Sister was a commercial disaster and reached only number 51 in the charts.

=== Later years of original band ===
The band returned to a mix of traditional and original material on the album Reflection, recorded in March 1971. It was received without enthusiasm by the music press. By this time the strains of touring and of working together as a band were apparent. Bill Leader, who produced the album, said it seemed that each day a different member of the group decided they were leaving. Pentangle withdrew from Transatlantic in a bitter dispute regarding royalties, Transatlantic having apparently believed that they were within their contractual rights to withhold payments. Joseph pointed out that his company had covered all the costs entailed in making the albums. Jo Lustig, their manager, who had agreed to the Transatlantic contract, made it clear that their contract with him included a clause that they could not sue him "for anything under any circumstances." In order to make some money out of their work, Pentangle established their own music publishing company, Swiggeroux Music, in 1971.

The final album of the original lineup was Solomon's Seal, released by Warner Brothers/Reprise in 1972. Its release was accompanied by a UK tour in which Pentangle were supported by Wizz Jones and Clive Palmer's band COB. The last few dates of the tour had to be cancelled when Thompson became ill. On New Year's Day, 1973, Jansch left the band. "Pentangle Split" was the front-page headline of the first issue of Melody Maker of the year.

=== Subsequent incarnations ===
A reunion of the band was planned in the early 1980s, by which time, Jansch and Renbourn had re-established their solo careers, McShee had a young family, Thompson was mainly doing session work, and Cox was running a restaurant in Minorca. The re-formed Pentangle appeared at the 1982 Cambridge Folk Festival, but without a drummer, as Cox had broken his leg in a road accident. They completed a tour of Italy, Australia and some venues in Germany, with Cox initially performing in a wheelchair.

Renbourn left the band to study classical music at Dartington College of Arts. There followed a series of replacement personnel: Mike Piggott replaced Renbourn in 1982, Nigel Portman Smith replaced Thompson in 1986 and Gerry Conway replaced Cox in 1987, leaving McShee and Jansch the only members remaining from the original line-up. In 1989, Rod Clements of Lindisfarne briefly replaced Piggott, to be replaced by Peter Kirtley the following year. The line-up of Jansch, McShee, Portman Smith, Kirtley and Conway survived almost as long as the original Pentangle and recorded three albums: Think of Tomorrow, One More Road and Live 1994. They completed a final tour in March–April 1995, after which Jansch left to pursue solo work, including his residency at the 12 Bar Club in London's Denmark Street.

=== Jacqui McShee's Pentangle ===
In 1995 McShee formed a trio, with Conway on percussion and Spencer Cozens on keyboards. Their first album, About Thyme, featured Ralph McTell, Albert Lee, Mike Mainieri and John Martyn as guests. About Thyme was released on the band's own label, GJS (Gerry Jacqui Spencer), and reached the top of fRoots magazine's British folk chart. Saxophonist Jerry Underwood and bassist/guitarist Alan Thomson were added, and the band, with the agreement of the original members, was renamed Jacqui McShee's Pentangle. The first album of the new five-piece band, Passe Avant, was released on the Park Records label in 1998. A concert recorded in April 2000 at Chipping Norton, Oxfordshire, was released by Park Records under the title At the Little Theatre.

Saxophonist Jerry Underwood died in 2002 and was replaced in 2004 by flautist/saxophonist Gary Foote. In 2005, the band released an album, Feoffees' Lands (feoffee being a medieval term for a trustee), on the GJS label. The 2011 Live In Concert album, released on GJS Records, featured some of the band's best performances in the years between 1997 and 2011. The new 2002 line-up of Jacqui McShee's Pentangle continued to perform regularly in the UK.

=== Continued interest in the original band ===
The new incarnations and personnel changes took the band in various musical directions, but interest in the original Pentangle line-up continued and at least nineteen compilation albums were released between 1972 and 2016, such as The Time Has Come 1967 – 1973, a 4-CD collection of rarities, outtakes and live performances issued in 2007, with liner notes written by Colin Harper and Pete Paphides.

In 2004, the 1968–1972 Lost Broadcasts album was released. Jo Lustig's earlier influence had secured numerous radio appearances for the band, including at least eleven broadcasts by the BBC in 1968, and the album was a 2-CD compilation of tracks from these sessions, including a recording of "The Name of the Game", which was used by the BBC as a theme song for some of the Pentangle broadcasts but had never appeared before on record.

The original Pentangle line-up reformed in 2008 and appeared on the BBC TV music programme Later... with Jools Holland on 29 April 2008, performing "Let No Man Steal Your Thyme"; and on 2 May 2008, performing "Light Flight" and "I've Got a Feeling". They undertook a UK tour that year which included a performance at the Royal Festival Hall, where they had recorded their Sweet Child album forty years earlier, and headlined at the Green Man Festival in Wales in August. A live double-CD album Finale - An Evening with Pentangle, containing 21 songs recorded during the 2008 tour, was released by Topic Records in October 2016.

In 2011, the original Pentangle played several concerts, including the Royal Festival Hall, Glastonbury and Cambridge. There were delays in performing together again because Jansch had throat cancer, but they were recording new material.

Bert Jansch died of cancer on 5 October 2011, aged 67. John Renbourn was found dead at his home on 26 March 2015 after a suspected heart attack. Danny Thompson died on 23 September 2025 and Terry Cox on 19 March 2026, leaving Jacqui McShee as the only surviving original member.

Film director Ben Wheatley included Pentangle's song "Let No Man Steal Your Thyme" in the 2020 Netflix film, Rebecca.

== Musical style ==
Were Pentangle a folk group, a folk-rock group, or something that resists classification? They could hardly be called a rock & roll act; they didn't use electric instruments often, and were built around two virtuoso guitarists, Bert Jansch and John Renbourn, who were already well-established on the folk circuit before the group formed. Yet their hunger for eclectic experimentation fit into the milieu of late-'60s progressive rock and psychedelia well, and much of their audience came from the rock and pop worlds, rather than the folk crowd. [...] The group mastered a breathtaking repertoire that encompassed traditional ballads, blues, jazz, pop, and reworkings of rock oldies, often blending different genres in the same piece. Their prodigious individual talents perhaps ensured a brief lifespan, but at their peak they melded their distinct and immense skills to egg each other on to heights they couldn't have achieved on their own, in the manner of great rock combos like the Beatles and Buffalo Springfield.

— Ritchie Unterberger of AllMusic

Pentangle's sound is characterised by "a unique jazz flavor and the distinctive twin guitars of Bert Jansch and John Renbourn." They are often characterised as a folk-rock band, although Danny Thompson preferred to describe the group as a "folk-jazz band." John Renbourn rejected the "folk-rock" description. He said, "One of the worst things you can do to a folk song is inflict a rock beat on it. . . . Most of the old songs that I have heard have their own internal rhythm. When we worked on those in the group, Terry Cox worked out his percussion patterns to match the patterns in the songs exactly. In that respect he was the opposite of a folk-rock drummer." This approach to songs led to the use of unusual time signatures: "Market Song" from Sweet Child moves from 7/4 to 11/4 and 4/4 time, and "Light Flight" from Basket of Light includes sections in 5/8, 7/8 and 6/4.

Ritchie Unterberger of AllMusic suggested the band's genre to be "something that resists classification," if not folk rock or traditional folk. Writing in The Times, Henry Raynor struggled to put the band's music into a category. "It is not a pop group, not a folk group and not a jazz group. What it attempts is music which is a synthesis of all these and other styles, as well as interesting experiments in each of them individually." Even Pentangle's earliest work is characterised by this synthesis of styles, and songs such as "Bruton Town" and "Let No Man Steal Your Thyme" from 1968's The Pentangle include elements of folk, jazz, blues and early music. Pete Townshend described their sound as "fresh and innovative". By the time they released their fourth album, Cruel Sister, in 1970, Pentangle had reverted to traditional folk music and had begun to use electric guitars. Folk music in Britain had moved towards a rock sound and the use of electrified instruments, and Cruel Sister invited comparison with such works as Fairport Convention's Liege and Lief and Steeleye Span's Hark! The Village Wait, which caused Pentangle to be referred to as one of the progenitors of British folk rock.

The band's style was also said to have taken stylistic cues from blues, classic rock, and pop.

In their final two albums Pentangle returned to their folk-jazz roots, but by then the genre's musical tastes had moved to British folk rock. Colin Harper commented that Pentangle's "increasingly fragile music was on borrowed time, and everyone knew it."

== Awards ==
In January 2007, the five original members of Pentangle were presented with a Lifetime Achievement award by Sir David Attenborough at the BBC Radio 2 Folk Awards. Producer John Leonard said Pentangle had been one of the most influential groups of the late 20th century, and it would be wrong not to acknowledge the contribution they had made to music. The group played together at the event for the first time in over 20 years. Their performance was broadcast on BBC Radio 2 on Wednesday 7 February 2007.

== Members ==
Current members

- Jacqui McShee - vocals (1968–1973, 1981–present)
- Spencer Cozens - keyboards, vocals, guitars (1995–present)
- Alan Thomson - bass, guitars (1995–present)
- Martin Winnings - saxophone (2023-present)
- Pascal Consoli - drums (2024-present, touring 2023-2024)

Former members

- Bert Jansch - guitar, vocals (1968–1973, 1981–1995; reunions - 2008, 2011; died 2011)
- Terry Cox - drums, vocals (1968–1973, 1981–1987; reunions - 2008, 2011; died 2026)
- Danny Thompson - double bass (1968–1973, 1981–1986; reunions - 2008, 2011; died 2025)
- John Renbourn - guitar, vocals (1968–1973, 1981–1982; reunions - 2008, 2011; died 2015)
- Mike Piggott - guitar, violin (1982–1989)
- Nigel Portman Smith - bass, keyboards (1986–1995)
- Gerry Conway - drums (1987–2024; his death)
- Rod Clements - guitar, mandolin (1989–1990)
- Peter Kirtley - guitars, vocals (1990–1995)
- Jerry Underwood - saxophone (1995–2002; his death)
- Gary Foote - flute, saxophone (2004–2023)

Timeline

== Discography ==
=== Albums ===
Year	Title	Chart positions	Label
Year	Title	UK	Label
1968	The Pentangle	21	Transatlantic
1968	Sweet Child	—	Transatlantic
1969	Basket of Light	5	Transatlantic
1970	Cruel Sister	51	Transatlantic
1971	Reflection	—	Transatlantic
1972	Solomon's Seal	—	Reprise
1985	Open the Door	—	Spindrift
1986	In the Round	—	Spindrift
1989	So Early in the Spring	—	Green Linnet
1991	Think of Tomorrow	—	Ariola
1993	One More Road	—	Permanent
1995	Live 1994	—	Hypertension
1995 (Jacqui McShee's Pentangle)	About Thyme Featuring Gerry Conway And Spencer Cozens	—	Hypertension
1998 (Jacqui McShee's Pentangle)	Passe Avant	—	Park Records
2000 (Jacqui McShee's Pentangle)	At The Little Theatre	—	Park Records
2005 (Jacqui McShee's Pentangle)	Feoffees' Lands	—	GJS Records
2011 (Jacqui McShee's Pentangle)	Live in Concert: Recorded On Tour 1997 - 2011	—	GJS Records
2016	Finale - An Evening with Pentangle	—	Topic Records
2021 "LP Reissue"	The Pentangle	—	Renaissance Records
2021 "LP Reissue"	Basket of Light	—	Renaissance Records
2021 "LP Reissue"	Cruel Sister	—	Renaissance Records
2021 "LP Reissue"	Pentangling	—	Renaissance Records
2023	Reunions: Live & BBC Sessions 1982 - 2011	—	Cherry Red Records

=== Singles ===
- "Travellin' Song"/"Mirage" (1968) GB S BigT B1G109
- "Let No Man Steal Your Thyme"/"Way Behind The Sun" (1968) Reprise 0784
- "Once I Had a Sweetheart"/"I Saw an Angel" (1969) Transatlantic BIG124 UK No. 46
- "Light Flight"/"Cold Mountain" (1969) Transatlantic BIG128 UK No. 43 (UK No. 45—re-entry)
- "Play the Game"/"Saturday Movie" (1986) UK Making Waves SURF 107
- "Set Me Free"/"Come to Me Easy" (1986) UK Making Waves SURF 121

=== Compilations ===
- This is Pentangle (1971)
- History Book (1972)
- Pentangling (1973)
- The Pentangle Collection (1975)
- Anthology (1978)
- At Their Best (1983)
- Essential Vol 1 (1987)
- Essential Vol 2 (1987)
- Collection (1988)
- A Maid That's Deep in Love (1989)
- Early Classics (1992)
- Anniversary (1992)
- People on the Highway, 1968–1971 (1992)
- Light Flight (1997)
- The Pentangle Family (2000)
- Light Flight: The Anthology (2001)
- Pentangling: The Collection (2004)
- The Time Has Come (2007)
- The Albums (2017)
- Pentangling (2021) (Renaissance Records) (Vinyl Reissue)
- Basket Of Light (2021) (Renaissance Records) (Vinyl Reissue)

=== DVDs ===
- Pentangle: Captured Live (2003)
- Jacqui McShee: Pentangle in Concert (2007)
- Folk Rock Legends (Steeleye Span and Pentangle) (2003)
