= The Black Balloon (album) =

Studio album by John Renbourn
- Released: 1979
- Studios: Crescent, Bath, Somerset
- Genre: Folk
- Length: 37:17
- Label: Transatlantic
- Producer: David Lord

John Renbourn chronology
John Renbourn and Stefan Grossman (1978)	The Black Balloon (1979)	So Early in the Spring (1979)

The Black Balloon is a 1979 album by John Renbourn.

== Critical reception ==
Professional ratings
Review scores
Source	Rating
AllMusic	3/5 stars
The Rolling Stone Album Guide	3/5 stars
Uncut	4/5 stars

The Washington Post wrote that, "in addition to a rhythmically engaging 13th-century English dance tune and a neatly woven medley of jig and reel, the album boasts a few enchanting moments as well."

== Track listing ==
All tracks are Traditional; arranged by John Renbourn; except where noted.

1. "The Moon Shines Bright" – 3:56
2. "The English Dance" – 2:51
3. "Bourrée I and II" – 2:22
4. "Medley:" – 9:28
  - "The Mist Covered Mountains of Home"
  - "The Orphan"
  - "Tarboulton"
5. "The Pelican" (John Renbourn) – 7:04
6. "The Black Balloon" (John Renbourn) – 11:34

== Personnel ==
- John Renbourn - acoustic and electric guitar
- Tony Roberts - flute
- Stuart Gordon - snare, tabors

Technical

- Bob Wagner - sleeve design
- Stefan Grossman - photography
