= Jacqui McShee =

British folk singer (born 1943)

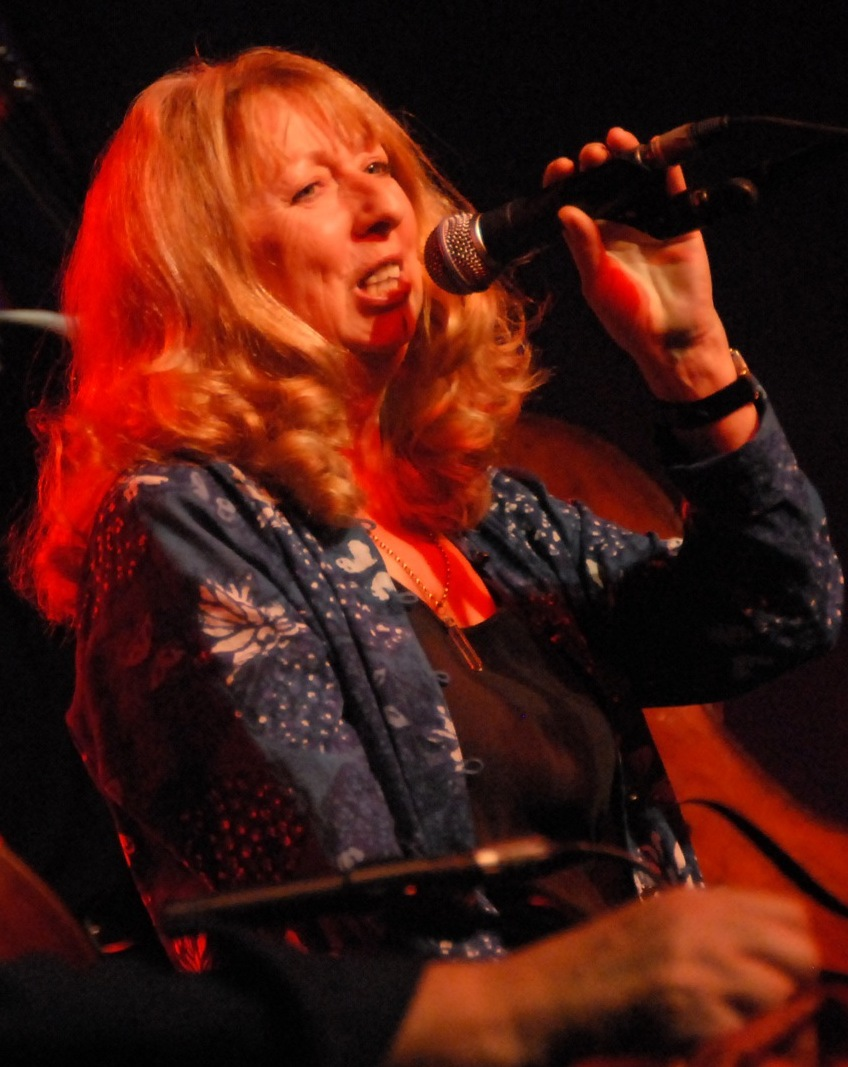
- McShee and Pentangle performing at the 2007 BBC Radio 2 Folk Awards

Background information
- Born: Jacqueline McShee; 25 December 1943 (age 82); Catford, South London, England
- Genres: Medieval folk rock; folk rock; folk baroque; psychedelic folk; British folk music; progressive folk; contemporary folk music; blues; jazz
- Occupation: Singer
- Member of: Pentangle
- Spouse: Gerry Conway (died 2024)

Jacqueline McShee (born 25 December 1943) is an English singer. Since 1966, she has performed with Pentangle, a jazz-influenced folk rock band.

== Biography ==
McShee was born in Catford, South London. Her musical career began as a soloist in British folk clubs in the mid 1960s. McShee and her sister Pam sang at demonstrations for the Campaign for Nuclear Disarmament.

After working with guitarist John Renbourn, she co-founded Pentangle. Pentangle established itself as one of the earliest exponents of the British folk rock movement. However, in addition to attracting fans of traditional British folk, they also drew audiences from the rock, pop and psychedelic folk worlds. The original band played a mixture of ballads, blues, and jazz, often blending these genres in the same piece.

In 1994, McShee formed a new band named Jacqui McShee's Pentangle which, with a few personnel changes, was still performing as of 2010.

In 1995, McShee performed as a session singer, along with her husband, drummer Gerry Conway, on the album Active in The Parish by the singer-songwriter David Hughes. In 1997, the album was voted a Q magazine 'Folk Album of the Year'. In 1998, McShee teamed up with Ulrich Maske to record The Frog and the Mouse and The Cat and the Fiddle. These two books were designed to help German children to learn to speak English.

In 2020, she and British guitarist Kevin Dempsey released From There to Here (MCDEM 001), a recording of self-composed songs and traditional tunes. In November 2020, she was reported to be living in Surrey, England.

== Personal life ==
She was married to drummer and percussionist Gerry Conway, who died in 2024 from motor neurone disease. She has two children, Matthew born in 1979, and Leah born in 1984.

== Discography ==
As a collective

- Jacqui McShee, Danny Thompson, Tony Roberts, Vic Abram, An Album of English Christmas Carols (1994)

As a session musician (session singer)

- John Renbourn, Another Monday (1966)
- David Hughes, Active in The Parish (1995) (along with drummer Gerry Conway)

Collaborations with Ulrich Maske

- The Frog and the Mouse (1998) (audio book)
- The Cat and the Fiddle (1998) (audio book)

Collaboration with British guitarist Kevin Dempsey

- From There to Here (2020)
