= Cantonal executive bodies of Switzerland =

The cantonal executive bodies of Switzerland are the executive branches of government in each of the 26 Swiss cantons. These bodies are typically composed of 5 or 7 members and operate as collegial authorities.

The names of the executive bodies vary by language region: they are generally known as Regierungsrat (Executive Council) in German-speaking Switzerland, Conseil d'État (State Council) in French-speaking Switzerland, and Consiglio di Stato (Council of State) in Italian-speaking Switzerland.

Each canton also has its own legislative body. For comparison, the Swiss Federal Council serves as the executive branch of the federal government of Switzerland.

== General structure ==
=== Presidents of the executives ===
The above mentioned collegial bodies are formally chaired by a president. However those presidents are primus inter pares, that is a first among equals in the council; other than presiding over meetings and the ability to cast tie-breaking votes, the president only holds ceremonial powers.

In the list below, unless otherwise noted, the official name of the office of president of the respective cantonal executive is Regierungsratspräsident (Government council president).

=== Elections ===
The cantonal governments are directly elected every four years. In some cantons (e.g. Basel-Stadt), the voters can cast a presidential vote for a candidate they are already voting for as member of the government. The elected member who has also received the most votes for president takes that office for the entirety of their term on the council, i.e. 4 years. In other cantons the electorate only elects the council members, and the presidency rotates according to seniority among members (e.g. Zürich and also in the federal council).

The date of the elections is not the same as the date of the start of the tenure. For example, the elections in Aargau were held in 2020, but the tenure of the new Executive started on 1 January 2021.

== List of cantonal executives ==
Parties

Note: due to the multiple official languages of Switzerland, parties may have more than one abbreviation

- BDP/PBD: Conservative Democratic Party (belonging to The Centre)
- CSP/PCS: Christian Social Party
- CSP OW: Christian Social Party of Obwalden
- Centre: The Centre
- CSPO: Christian Social People's Party of Upper Valais (belonging to The Centre)
- CVP/PDC/PPD/PCD : Christian Democratic People's Party (belonging to The Centre)
- EVP: Evangelical People's Party of Switzerland
- FDP/PLR: FDP.The Liberals
- GLP/PVL: Green Liberal Party
- Green: Green Party
- Ind: Independent
- LDP: Liberal Democratic Party of Basel-Stadt (belonging to the FDP)
- Lega: Ticino League
- LJS: Liberté et Justice sociale (Freedom and Social Justice)
- MCG: Geneva Citizens’ Movement
- SP/PS: Social Democratic Party
- SVP/UDC/PPS: Swiss People's Party

List as of 2 July 2022
Canton			Executive Official name(s)	Members	Member list (president first and in bold)	Elections	
Canton			Executive Official name(s)	Members	Member list (president first and in bold)	Prev	Next
Aargau	AG	Aargau	Executive Council; Regierungsrat (German)	5	**Dieter Egli (Note: President officially called Landammann) (SP)** Stephan Attiger (FDP) Martina Bircher (SVP) Markus Dieth (CVP) Jean-Pierre Gallati (SVP)	2024	2028
Appenzell Ausserrhoden	AR	Appenzell Ausserrhoden	Executive Council; Regierungsrat (German)	5	**Hansueli Reutegger (SPV)** Katrin Alder (FDP) Dölf Biasotto (FDP) Yves Noël Balmer (SP) Alfred Stricker [de] (Ind)	2023	2027
Appenzell Innerrhoden	AI	Appenzell Innerrhoden	State Commission; Standeskommission (German)	7	**Roland Dähler (Ind)** Monika Rüegg Bless (Centre) Ruedi Eberle (SVP) Hans Dörig (Ind) Angela Koller (Centre) Stefan Müller (Ind) Jakob Signer (Ind)		
Basel-Country	BL	Basel-Landschaft	Executive Council; Regierungsrat (German)	5	**Isaac Reber (Note: President officially called Regierungspräsident) (Green)** Monica Gschwind (FDP) Thomi Jourdan (EVP) Anton Lauber (Centre) Kathrin Schweizer (SP)	2023	2027
Basel-City	BS	Basel-Stadt	Executive Council; Regierungsrat (German)	7	**Conradin Cramer (LDP)** Mustafa Atici (SP) Lukas Engelberger (Centre) Stephanie Eymann (LDP) Esther Keller (GLP) Tanja Soland (SP) Kaspar Sutter (SP)	2024	2028
Berne	BE	Bern	Executive Council; Regierungsrat (German); Conseil exécutif (French)	7	**Christoph Neuhaus (SVP)** Evi Allemann (SP) Christoph Ammann (SP) Astrid Bärtschi (Centre) Christine Häsler (Green) Philippe Müller (FDP) Pierre Alain Schnegg (SVP)	2022	2026
Fribourg	FR	Fribourg	Council of State; Conseil d'État (French); Staatsrat (German)	7	**Jean-François Steiert (SP)** Sylvie Bonvin-Sansonnens (Green) Didier Castella (FDP) Romain Collaud (FDP) Olivier Curty (Centre) Philippe Demierre (SVP) Jean-Pierre Siggen (Centre)	2022	2026
Geneva	GE	Geneva	Council of State; Conseil d'État (French)	7	**Thierry Apothéloz (SP)** Delphine Bachmann (Centre) Nathalie Fontanet (FDP) Anne Hiltpold (FDP) Antonio Hodgers (Green) Carole-Anne Kast (SP) Pierre Maudet (LJS)	2023	2028
Glarus	GL	Glarus	Executive Council; Regierungsrat (German)	7	**Kaspar Becker (Centre)** Markus Heer (SP) Marianne Lienhard (SVP) Christian Marti (FDP) Thomas Tschudi (SVP)	2022	2026
Grisons	GR	Grisons	Government; Regierung (German); Regenza (Romansh); Governo (Italian)	5	**Marcus Caduff (Centre)** Martin Bühler (FDP) Carmelia Maissen (Centre) Jon Domenic Parolini (Centre) Peter Peyer (SP)	2023	2026
Jura	JU	Jura	Government; Gouvernement (French)	5	**Martial Courtet (Centre)** Nathalie Barthoulot (SP) Rosalie Beuret Siess (SP) David Eray (CSP) Stéphane Theurillat (Centre)	2021	2025
Lucerne	LU	Lucerne	Executive Council; Regierungsrat (German)	5	**Reto Wyss (Centre)** Ylfete Fanaj (SP) Armin Hartmann (SVP) Fabian Peter (FDP) Michaela Tschuor (Centre)	2023	2027
Neuchâtel	NE	Neuchâtel	Council of State; Conseil d'État (French)	5	**Crystel Graf (FDP)** Laurent Favre (FDP) Frédéric Mairy (SP) Florence Nater (SP) Céline Vara (Green)	2025	2029
Nidwalden	NW	Nidwalden	Executive Council; Regierungsrat (German)	7	**Res Schmid (SVP)** Michèle Blöchliger (SVP) Joe Christen (FDP) Othmar Filliger (Centre) Karin Kayser-Frutschi (Centre) Therese Rotzer-Mathyer (Centre) Peter Truttmann (GLP)	2022	2026
Obwalden	OW	Obwalden	Executive Council; Regierungsrat (German)	5	Christian Schäli (CSP) Christoph Amstad (CVP) Josef Hess (Independent) Cornelia Kaufmann-Hurschler (CVP) Daniel Wyler (SVP)	2022	2026
Schaffhausen	SH	Schaffhausen	Executive Council; Regierungsrat (German)	5	**Martin Kessler (FDP)** Cornelia Stamm Hurter (SVP) Marcel Montanari (FDP) Patrick Strasser (SP) Dino Tamagni (SVP)	2024	2028
Schwyz	SZ	Schwyz	Executive Council; Regierungsrat (German)	7	**Michael Stähli (Centre)** Herbert Huwiler (SVP) Damian Meier (FDP) Sandro Patiernor (Centre) André Rüegsegger (SVP) Xaver Schuler (SVP) Petra Steimen-Rickenbacher (FDP)	2019	2023
Solothurn	SO	Solothurn	Executive Council; Regierungsrat (German)	5	**Remo Ankli (FDP)** Peter Hodel (FDP) Sandra Kolly-Altermatt (Centre) Susanne Schaffner (SP) Brigit Wyss (Green)	2017	2021
St. Gallen	SG	St. Gallen	Government; Regierung (German)	7	**Fredy Fässler (SP)** Laura Bucher (SP) Bruno Damann (Centre) Susanne Hartmann (Centre) Stefan Kölliker (SVP) Marc Mächler (FDP) Beat Tinner (FDP)	2020	2024
Thurgau	TG	Thurgau	Executive Council; Regierungsrat (German)	5	**Cornelia Komposch-Breuer (SP)** Dominik Diezi (Centre) Monika Knill-Kradolfer (SVP) Urs Martin (SVP) Walter Schönholzer (FDP)		
Ticino	TI	Ticino	Council of State; Consiglio di Stato (Italian)	5	**Claudio Zali (Lega)** Manuele Bertoli (SP) Raffaele De Rosa (Centre) Norman Gobbi (Lega) Christian Vitta (FDP)		
Uri	UR	Uri	Executive Council; Regierungsrat (German)	7	**Urs Janett (FDP)** Christian Arnold (SVP) Urban Camenzind (Centre) Daniel Furrer (Centre) Beat Jörg (Centre) Dimitri Moretti (SP) Roger Nager (FDP)	2020	2024
Valais	VS	Valais	Council of State; Conseil d'État (French); Staatsrat (German)	5	**Roberto Schmidt (CSPO)** Christophe Darbellay (Centre) Frédéric Favre (FDP) Mathias Reynard (SP) Franz Ruppen (SVP)		
Vaud	VD	Vaud	Council of State; Conseil d'État (French)	7	**Christelle Luisier** (FDP) Frédéric Borloz (FDP) Valérie Dittli (Centre) Nuria Gorrite (SP) Isabelle Moret (FDP) Rebecca Ruiz (SP) Vassilis Venizelos (Green)		
Zug	ZG	Zug	Executive Council; Regierungsrat (German)	7	**Martin Pfister (Centre)** Andreas Hostettler (FDP) Stephan Schleiss (SVP) Heinz Tännler (SVP) Silvia Thalmann-Gut (Centre) Beat Villiger (Centre) Florian Weber (FDP)	2019	2023
Zurich	ZH	Zurich	Executive Council; Regierungsrat (German)	7	**Jacqueline Fehr (Note: President officially called Regierungsratspräsident (President of the Government council)) (SP)** Mario Fehr (independent) Martin Neukom (Green) Natalie Rickli (SVP) Silvia Steiner (Centre) Ernst Stocker (SVP) Carmen Walker Späh (FDP)	2019	2023
Confederation	CH	Confederation	Federal Council Bundesrat (German) Conseil fédéral (French) Consiglio federale (Italian) Cussegl federal (Romansh)	7	Alain Berset (SP) Viola Amherd (Centre) Guy Parmelin (SVP) Ignazio Cassis (FDP) Karin Keller-Sutter (FDP) Albert Rösti (SVP) Elisabeth Baume-Schneider (SP)	2019	2023

== See also ==
- Cantonal legislatures of Switzerland
- Small Council
- Municipal executive in Switzerland
