= Eurovision Song Contest 2025 =

International song competition

- Welcome Home (Note: While "United by Music" has been the permanent slogan of the contest as a whole since November 2023, the Swiss host broadcaster SRG SSR adopted "Welcome Home" as the concept and "motto" for the 2025 edition specifically.)

Dates and venue
- Semi-final 1: 13 May 2025
- Semi-final 2: 15 May 2025
- Final: 17 May 2025
- Venue: St. Jakobshalle; Basel, Switzerland

Organisation
- Organiser: European Broadcasting Union (EBU)
- ESC director: Martin Green
- Executive supervisor: Martin Österdahl

Production
- Host broadcaster: Swiss Broadcasting Corporation (SRG SSR)
- Directors: Robin Hofwander; Fredrik Bäcklund; Myriam von Necker
- Executive producers: Reto Peritz; Moritz Stadler
- Presenters: Hazel Brugger; Sandra Studer; Michelle Hunziker (final)

Participants
- Number of entries: 37
- Number of finalists: 26
- Returning countries: Montenegro
- Non-returning countries: Moldova
- Participation map: Finalist countries Countries eliminated in the semi-finals Countries that participated in the past but not in 2025

Vote
- Voting system: Each country awards one set in the semi-finals, or two sets in the final of 12, 10, 8–1 points to ten songs. In all three shows, online votes from viewers in non-participating countries are aggregated and awarded as one set of points.
- Winning song: Austria "Wasted Love"

The Eurovision Song Contest 2025 was the 69th edition of the Eurovision Song Contest. It consisted of two semi-finals on 13 and 15 May and a final on 17 May 2025, held at St. Jakobshalle in Basel, Switzerland, and presented by Hazel Brugger and Sandra Studer, with Michelle Hunziker joining for the final. It was organised by the European Broadcasting Union (EBU) and host broadcaster the Swiss Broadcasting Corporation (SRG SSR), which staged the event after winning the 2024 contest for Switzerland with the song "The Code" by Nemo.

Broadcasters from thirty-seven countries participated in the contest, the same number as the previous two editions. Montenegro returned after a two-year absence, while Moldova, which had originally planned to participate, later withdrew due to economic reasons and the quality of the songs competing in its national selection. Israel's participation continued to cause controversy in the context of the Gaza war, with some participating broadcasters calling for a discussion on the issue.

The winner was Austria with the song "Wasted Love", performed by JJ and written by him along with Teodora Špirić and Thomas Thurner. Austria won the combined vote and jury vote, and placed fourth in the televote. Israel won the televote and finished in second place, with Estonia, Sweden, and Italy completing the top five. The EBU reported that the contest had a television audience of 166 million viewers in 37 European markets, an increase of three million viewers from the previous edition.

== Location ==
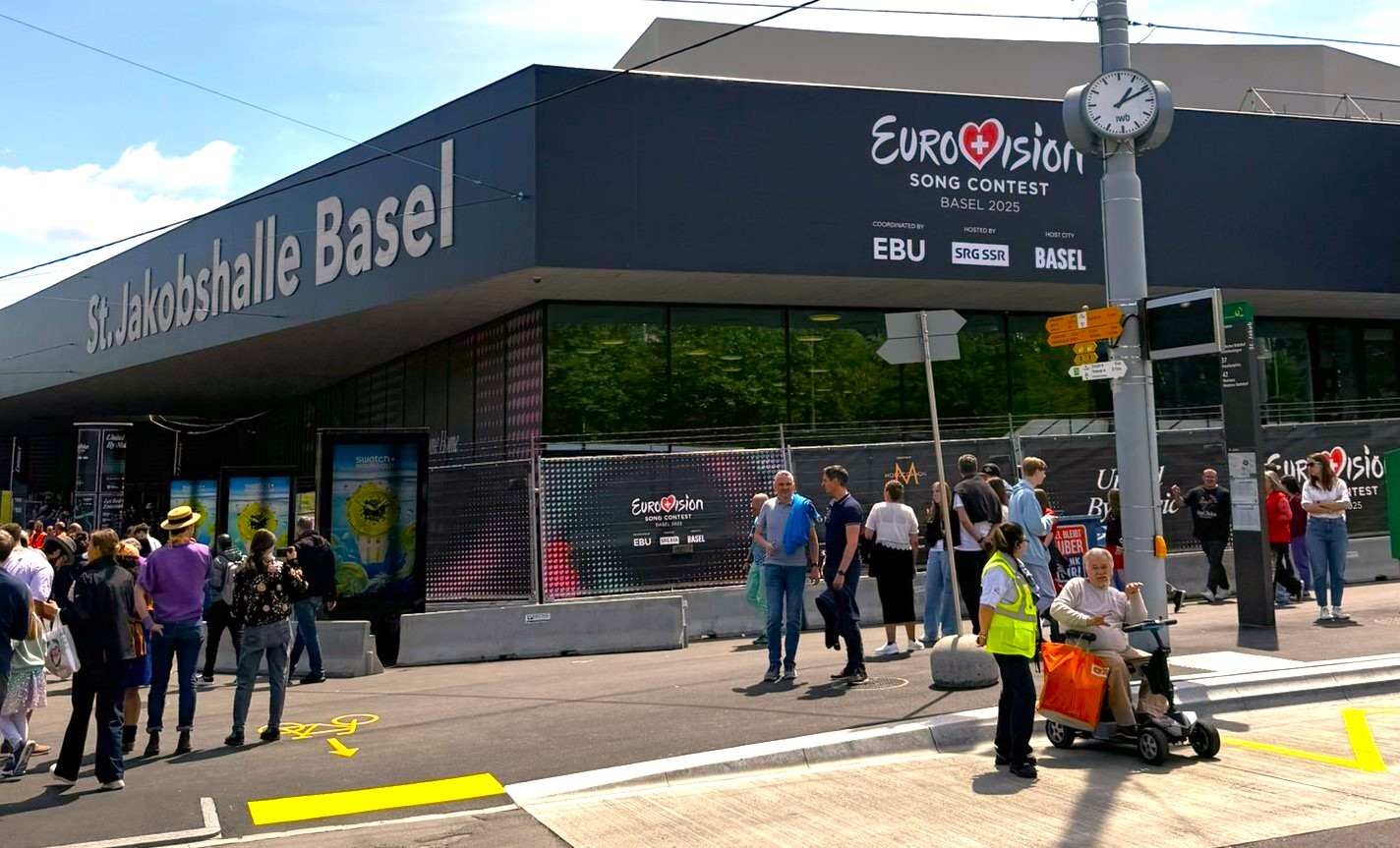
St. Jakobshalle, Basel – host venue of the 2025 contest

Location of host venue and Arena Plus (red) and other contest-related sites and events (blue)

The 2025 contest took place in Basel, Switzerland, following the country's victory at the 2024 contest with the song "The Code", performed by Nemo. It was the third time that Switzerland had hosted the contest, having previously done so for the inaugural contest in 1956 and the 1989 contest, held in Lugano and Lausanne respectively. The selected venue for the contest was the 12,400-seat St. Jakobshalle, which serves as a venue for indoor sports and concert events. The arena is located in the municipality of Münchenstein in Basel-Landschaft, right by the border with Basel-Stadt.

The Messe and Congress Center Basel complex hosted several events related to the contest. It was the location of the Eurovision Village, which hosted performances by contest participants and local artists as well as screenings of the live shows for the general public; and the EuroClub, which organised the official after-parties and private performances by contest participants. The "Turquoise Carpet" event on 11 May 2025 began at the Basel Town Hall and ran through the Middle Bridge, with the contestants and their delegations being presented before accredited press and fans, before ending at Messe Basel, where the opening ceremony was held. The St. Jakob-Park stadium held a screening of the final along with performances by four previous Eurovision entrants, (Note: Namely Kate Ryan (Belgium 2006), Anna Rossinelli (Switzerland 2011), Luca Hänni (Switzerland 2019), and Baby Lasagna (Croatia 2024), in addition to DJ Antoine) with entry charged for the public; the stadium was also featured on the live broadcast and was referred to as "Arena Plus" for the occasion. The Eurovision Street was located at Steinenvorstadt.

=== Bidding phase ===
The location of the host city Basel (in blue), shortlisted cities (in green), other bidding cities (in red) and cities and towns that expressed interest but ultimately did not bid (in grey)

After Switzerland's win in the 2024 contest, the local authorities of Geneva expressed their interest in hosting the 2025 edition at Palexpo and submitted a formal application. On the same day, the president of the Basel-Stadt government, Conradin Cramer, also expressed interest in Basel hosting the 2025 event. On 12 May, Olma Hall in St. Gallen was proposed as a potential venue.

On 13 May, Lugano, which hosted the inaugural contest in 1956, ruled out a bid to host in 2025. The president of Bern's cantonal government Philippe Müller expressed his reluctance to host the contest in the de facto Swiss capital, but the cantonal government itself later announced its support in organising the event in Bern. Meanwhile, Zurich's city council held a "high priority" meeting to discuss a bid. On 14 May, Lausanne, which hosted the 1989 contest, ruled out a bid to host in 2025, citing a lack of infrastructure. On 15 May, Biel/Bienne declared its interest to be associated with and co-host the event. On 17 May, the local government of Fribourg stated that it was examining a potential bid. On 5 June, the Basel-Stadt government confirmed that it would bid, proposing St. Jakobshalle and St. Jakob-Park as possible venues. On 6 June, Biel/Bienne and Bern's municipalities announced a joint bid. On 12 June, St. Gallen announced that it would not submit a bid due to not meeting the requirements to host the event.

The host broadcaster, the Swiss Broadcasting Corporation (SRG SSR), launched the bidding process on 27 May 2024, by issuing a list of requirements for interested cities. Basel, Bern, Geneva, and Zurich officially declared their interest and finalised their bids on 28 June. Representatives from the host broadcaster visited the four bidding cities in early July, and shortlisted Basel and Geneva on 19 July. On 30 August, the European Broadcasting Union (EBU) and SRG SSR announced Basel as the host city, with St. Jakobshalle as the chosen venue. A referendum was held in November 2024 within the Basel-Stadt canton to approve the expenditure for organising the contest, which passed with the support of 66.6% of voters.

Key:
† Host city * Shortlisted ^ Submitted a bid

City	Venue	Notes	Ref.
Basel †	St. Jakob-Park	Hosted the 2016 UEFA Europa League final and would host matches of the UEFA Women's Euro 2025. The proposal was dependent on the construction of a roof to cover the stadium.	
Basel †	St. Jakobshalle	Hosts the annual Swiss Indoors tennis championships.	
Bern with Biel/Bienne ^	Neue Festhalle	Proposal set around a planned music venue, constructed within the Bernexpo complex.	
Geneva *	Palexpo	Hosted the annual Geneva International Motor Show. It also hosted the 2014 Davis Cup semi-finals and the 2019 Laver Cup.	
St. Gallen	Olma Hall	—	
Zurich ^	Hallenstadion	Hosted the annual Zurich Open from 1993 to 2008.	
Zurich ^	Swiss Life Arena	Planned venue for the 2026 IIHF World Championship	

== Participants ==
Eurovision Song Contest 2025 – Participation summaries by country
- Albania; Armenia; Australia; Austria; Azerbaijan; Belgium; Croatia; Cyprus; Czechia; Denmark; Estonia; Finland; France; Georgia; Germany; Greece; Iceland; Ireland; Israel; Italy; Latvia; Lithuania; Luxembourg; Malta; ~~Moldova~~; Montenegro; Netherlands; Norway; Poland; Portugal; San Marino; Serbia; Slovenia; Spain; Sweden; Switzerland; Ukraine; United Kingdom

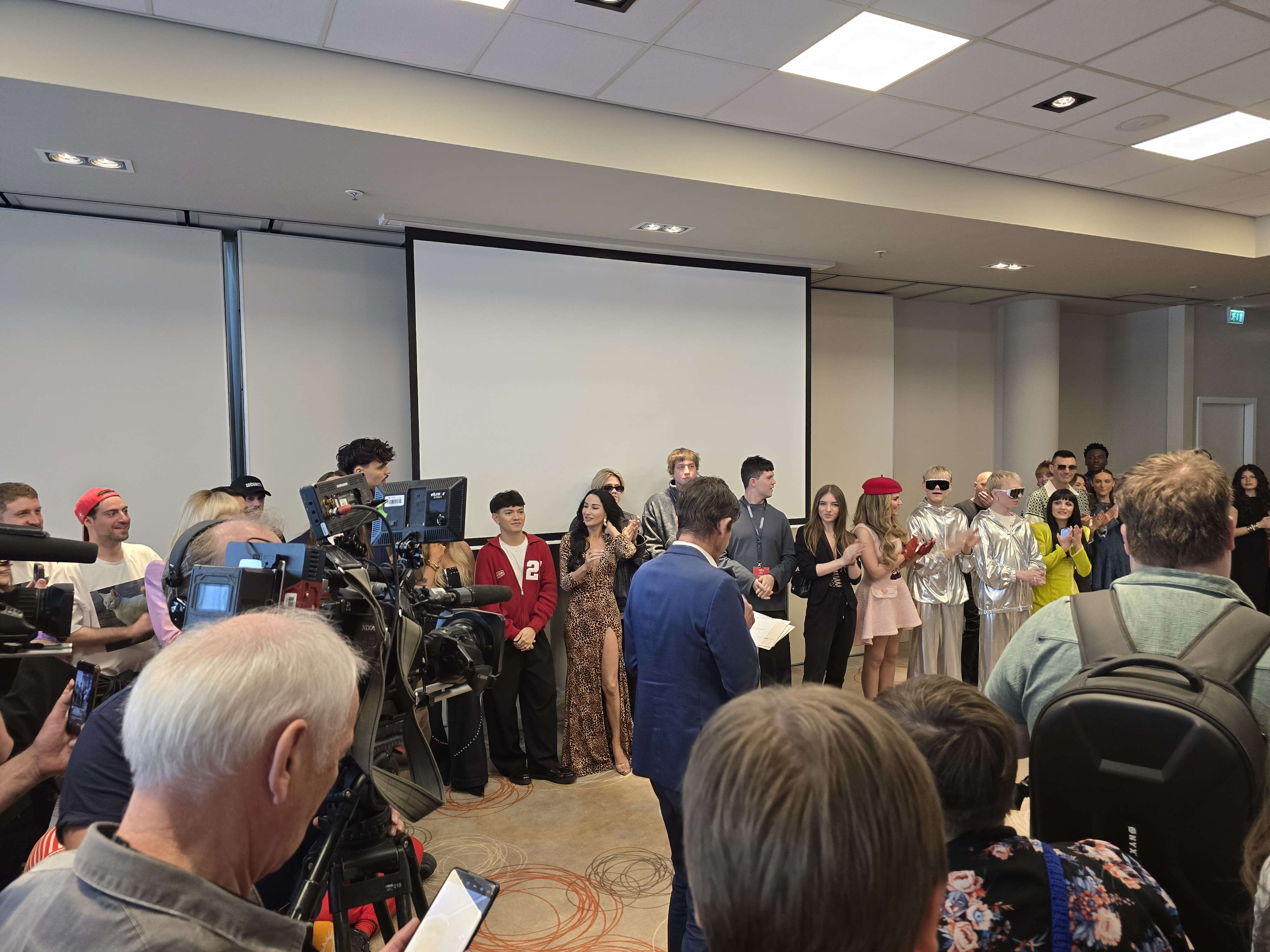
A group of participating artists of the Eurovision Song Contest 2025 at the Eurovision in Concert pre-party event in Amsterdam, April 2025

Eligibility for participation in the Eurovision Song Contest requires a national broadcaster with an EBU membership that is capable of receiving the contest via the Eurovision network and broadcasting it live nationwide. The EBU issues invitations to participate in the contest to all members.

On 12 December 2024, the EBU initially announced that broadcasters from 38 countries would participate in the 2025 contest, including Montenegro, returning after a two-year absence. On 22 January 2025, Moldova announced its withdrawal, citing economic reasons and the quality of its national final, thereby reducing the number of participating countries to 37.

The contest featured two returning artists for the same country: Justyna Steczkowska had previously represented Poland in 1995, and Nina Žižić had appeared with Who See for Montenegro in 2013. Steczkowska's return 30 years after her first appearance broke the record for the longest gap between two participations by the same artist, which was previously held by Anna Vissi with a gap of 24 years between her entries for Cyprus in 1982 and Greece in 2006.

Eurovision Song Contest 2025 participants
Country	Broadcaster	Artist	Song	Language(s)	Songwriter(s)	Ref.
Albania	RTSH	Shkodra Elektronike	"Zjerm"	Albanian (Note: Specifically Gheg Albanian)	Lekë Gjeloshi; Beatriçe Gjergji; Kolë Laca	
Armenia	AMPTV	Parg	"Survivor"	English, Armenian	Benjamin Alasu; Jon Aljidi; Peter Boström; Joshua Curran; Thomas G:son; Martin Mooradian; Armen Paul; Pargev Vardanian; Eva Voskanian; Alex Wilke	
Australia	SBS	Go-Jo	"Milkshake Man"	English	Jason Bovino; Amy Sheppard; George Sheppard; Marty Zambotto	
Austria	ORF	JJ	"Wasted Love"	English	Johannes Pietsch; Teodora Špirić; Thomas Thurner	
Azerbaijan	İTV	Mamagama	"Run with U"	English	Hasan Hayadar; Sefael Mishiyev; Roman Zee	
Belgium	VRT	Red Sebastian	"Strobe Lights"	English	Billie Bentein; Seppe Herreman; Astrid Roelants; Willem Vanderstichele	
Croatia	HRT	Marko Bošnjak	"Poison Cake"	English	Marko Bošnjak; Emma Gale; Ben Pyne; Bas Wissink	
Cyprus	CyBC	Theo Evan	"Shh"	English	Linda Dale; Dimitris Kontopoulos; Lasse Nymann; Elsa Søllesvik; Elke Tiel	
Czechia	ČT	Adonxs	"Kiss Kiss Goodbye"	English	Lorenzo Calvo; Michaela Charvátová; Inés Coulon; Ronald Janeček; George Masters-Clark; Adam Pavlovčin; Adriano Lopes da Silva	
Denmark	DR	Sissal	"Hallucination"	English	Linnea Deb; Melanie Hayrapetian; Malthe Johansen; Sissal Jóhanna Norðberg Niclasen; Chris Rohde-Frisk; Lina Spangsberg; Marcus Winther-John	
Estonia	ERR	Tommy Cash	"Espresso Macchiato"	Italian, (Note: Specifically the Broccolino dialect, an American variety of Italian) English	Johannes Naukkarinen; Tomas Tammemets	
Finland	Yle	Erika Vikman	"Ich komme"	Finnish, German	Christel Roosberg; Jori Roosberg	
France	France Télévisions	Louane	"Maman"	French	Anne Peichert; Tristan Salvati	
Georgia	GPB	Mariam Shengelia	"Freedom"	Georgian, English	Keti Gabisiani; Buka Kartozia	
Germany	NDR (Note: On behalf of the German public broadcasting consortium ARD)	Abor & Tynna	"Baller"	German	Attila Bornemisza; Tünde Bornemisza; Alexander Hauer	
Greece	ERT	Klavdia	"Asteromata" (Αστερομάτα)	Greek	Arcade; Klavdia Papadopoulou	
Iceland	RÚV	Væb	"Róa"	Icelandic	Gunnar Björn Gunnarsson; Hálfdán Helgi Matthíasson; Ingi Þór Garðarsson; Matthías Davíð Matthíasson	
Ireland	RTÉ	Emmy	"Laika Party"	English	Truls Marius Aarra; Emmy Kristine Guttulsrud Kristiansen; Erlend Guttulsrud Kristiansen; Henrik Østlund; Larissa Tormey	
Israel	IPBC	Yuval Raphael	"New Day Will Rise"	English, French, Hebrew	Keren Peles	
Italy	RAI	Lucio Corsi	"Volevo essere un duro"	Italian	Lucio Corsi; Tommaso Ottomano	
Latvia	LSM	Tautumeitas	"Bur man laimi"	Latvian	Laura Līcīte; Elvis Lintiņš; Asnate Rancāne; Aurēlija Rancāne; Gabriēla Zvaigznīte	
Lithuania	LRT	Katarsis	"Tavo akys"	Lithuanian	Lukas Radzevičius	
Luxembourg	RTL	Laura Thorn	"La poupée monte le son"	French	Christophe Houssin; Julien Salvia; Ludovic-Alexandre Vidal	
Malta	PBS	Miriana Conte	"Serving"	English	Miriana Conte; Sarah Evelyn Fullerton; Matthew Mercieca; Benjamin Schmid	
Montenegro	RTCG	Nina Žižić	"Dobrodošli" (Добродошли)	Montenegrin	Darko Dimitrov; Violeta Mihajlovska Milić; Boris Subotić	
Netherlands	AVROTROS	Claude	"C'est la vie"	French, English	Claude Kiambe; Arno Krabman; Léon Paul Palmen; Joren van der Voort	
Norway	NRK	Kyle Alessandro	"Lighter"	English	Adam Allskog; Kyle Alessandro Helgesen Villalobos	
Poland	TVP	Justyna Steczkowska	"Gaja"	Polish, English	Dominic Buczkowski-Wojtaszek; Patryk Kumór; Justyna Steczkowska; Emilian Waluchowski	
Portugal	RTP	Napa	"Deslocado"	Portuguese	Diogo Góis; Guilherme Gomes; João Lourenço Gomes; João Rodrigues; André Santos; Francisco Sousa	
San Marino	SMRTV	Gabry Ponte (Note: Features uncredited vocals by Andrea Bonomo and Edwyn Roberts)	"Tutta l'Italia"	Italian	Andrea Bonomo; Gabriele Ponte; Edwyn Roberts	
Serbia	RTS	Princ	"Mila" (Мила)	Serbian	Dušan Bačić	
Slovenia	RTVSLO	Klemen	"How Much Time Do We Have Left"	English	Klemen Slakonja	
Spain	RTVE	Melody	"Esa diva"	Spanish	Alberto Lorite; Melodía Ruiz Gutiérrez	
Sweden	SVT	KAJ	"Bara bada bastu"	Swedish, (Note: Specifically the Vörå dialect, an Ostrobothnian variety of Finland Swedish spoken in and around Vörå) Finnish	Axel Åhman; Kevin Holmström; Jakob Norrgård; Robert Skowronski; Kristofer Strandberg; Anderz Wrethov	
Switzerland	SRG SSR	Zoë Më	"Voyage"	French	Zoë Kressler; Emily Middlemas; Tom Oehler	
Ukraine	Suspilne	Ziferblat	"Bird of Pray"	Ukrainian, English	Fedir Khodakov; Danylo Leshchynskyi; Valentyn Leshchynskyi	
United Kingdom	BBC	Remember Monday	"What the Hell Just Happened?"	English	Julie Aagaard; Sam Brennan; Lauren Byrne; Tom Hollings; Holly-Anne Hull; Kes Kamara; Charlotte Steele; Thomas Stengaard	

=== Other countries ===
The EBU member broadcasters in Andorra, Bosnia and Herzegovina, and Slovakia confirmed non-participation prior to the announcement of the participants list by the EBU. Macedonian broadcaster MRT discussed a potential return of the country to the contest, in response to an email from Eurovision fans urging the broadcaster to do so in October 2024; North Macedonia ultimately did not appear on the final list of participants for 2025. Kosovar broadcaster RTK's general director Shkumbin Ahmetxhekaj sent a formal letter to the EBU in June 2024, requesting an invitation for Kosovo to debut in the contest in 2025; this was rejected by the EBU's General Assembly in July 2024.

== Production and format ==
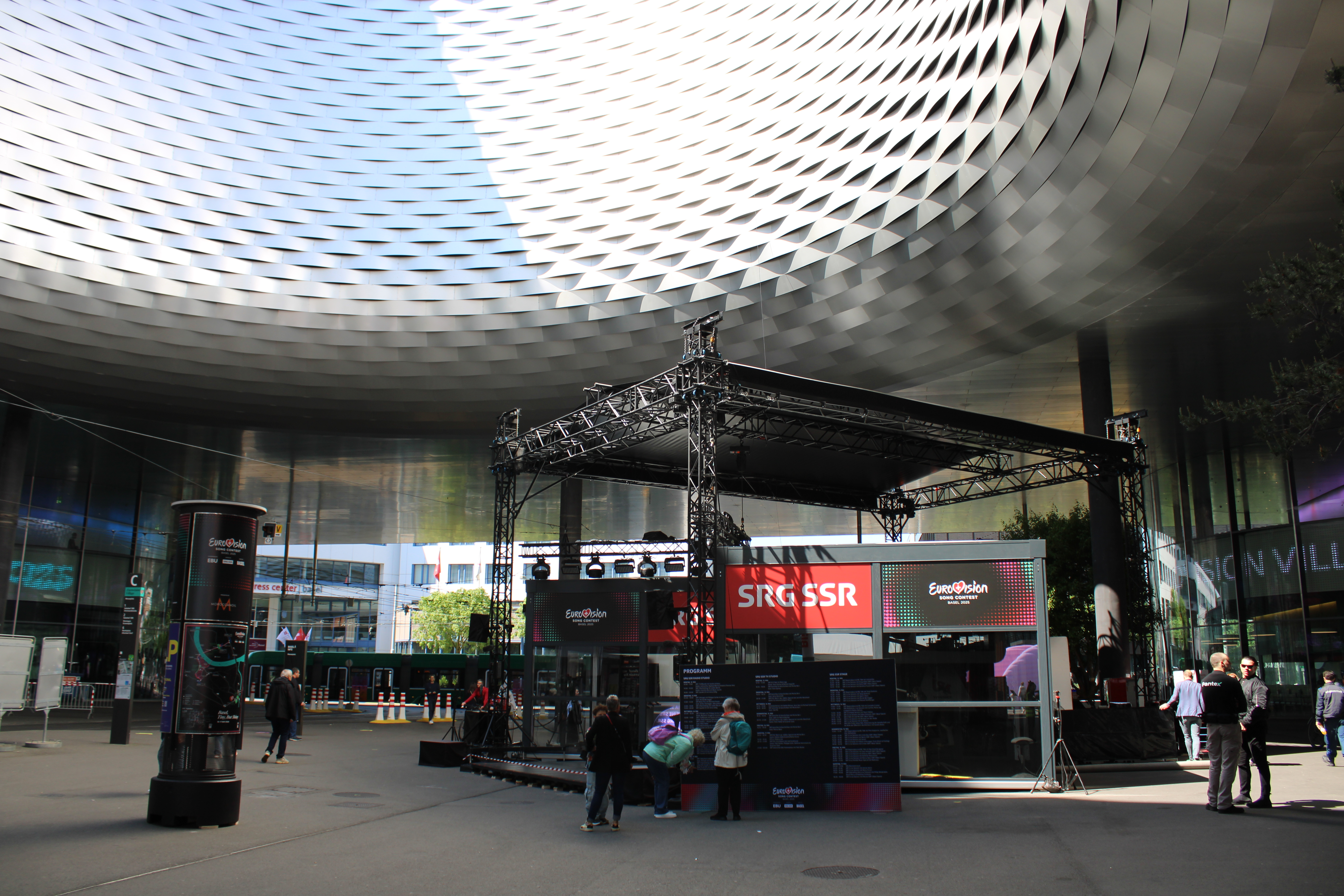
SRG SSR's mobile radio booth at the Eurovision Village in Messe Basel

The Eurovision Song Contest 2025 was produced by the Swiss national broadcaster SRG SSR. The core team consisted of Reto Peritz and Moritz Stadler as executive producers, and Yves Schifferle as head of show. Repeating their function from the previous edition were Christer Björkman as head of contest, Tobias Åberg as head of production, and Robin Hofwander and Fredrik Bäcklund as multi-camera directors, with other production personnel including Nadja Burkhardt-Tracol as head of event, Manfred Winz as head of finance, Aurore Chatard as head of security, and Kevin Stuber as head of legal. The theme art and background music's creation are overseen by art director Artur Deyneuve.

The contest's organisation was restructured for 2025; this was announced by the EBU on 1 July 2024, following a review into the controversies of the 2024 contest. Two new positions were created: the ESC director and the commercial director, filled by Martin Green (managing director of the 2023 contest) and Jurian van der Meer, respectively; Green would oversee the work of executive supervisor Martin Österdahl and Van der Meer. In response to the circumstances that led to the disqualification of the 2024 Dutch entrant Joost Klein from that year's final, from 2025 onwards, no behind-the-scenes filming of the artists would be permitted without prior approval from their delegations' head of press. A set of conduct rules and duty of care guidelines was codified and made mandatory for all personnel working in the event.

The allocated budget was CHF 61 million (€65.2 million), with the Executive Council of Basel-Stadt contributing CHF 35 million (€37.3 million), SRG SSR contributing CHF 20 million (€21.4 million), and the EBU contributing CHF 6 million (€6.4 million). CHF 1.7 million was ultimately left unspent by the Basel-Stadt canton.

=== Visual, sound, and stage design ===
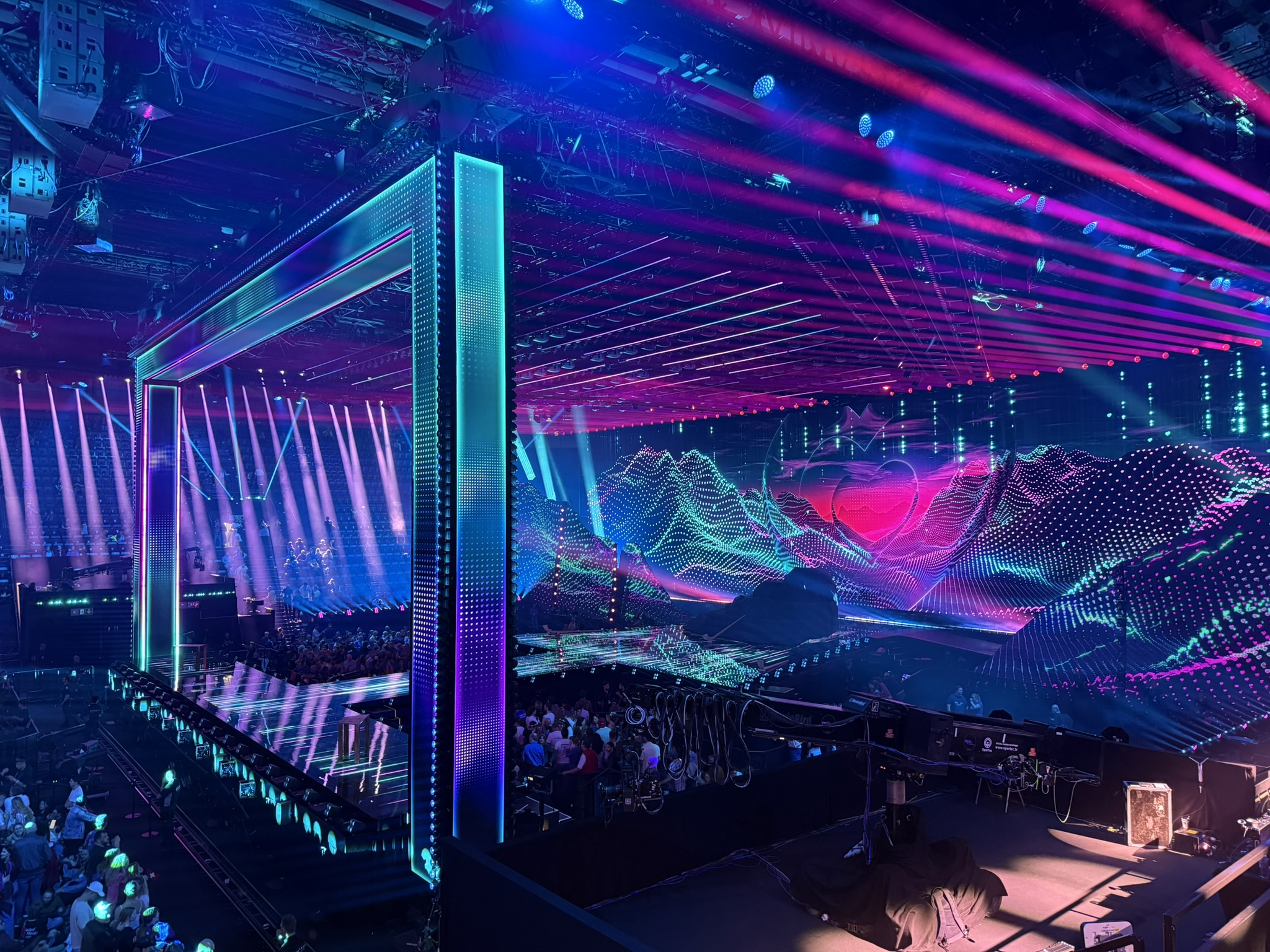
The stage in the arena

On 16 December 2024, SRG SSR unveiled the theme art and stage design for the 2025 contest. The theme art, designed by the London-based agency Not Wieden+Kennedy and named "Unity Shapes Love", was built on variably-coloured miniatures of the "Eurovision heart" being arranged to emulate the halftone pixelation effect, symbolising "millions of people unified by the Eurovision Song Contest, to listen and celebrate together". The theme music, produced by MassiveMusic and titled "See You Radiate", featured nods to Swiss traditional music. Devised for the second year in a row by German production designer Florian Wieder, who had previously designed the sets of seven previous contests, the stage was inspired by Switzerland's mountains and linguistic diversity, highlighted by a central extension that extends into the standing audience area and surrounded by an LED arch.

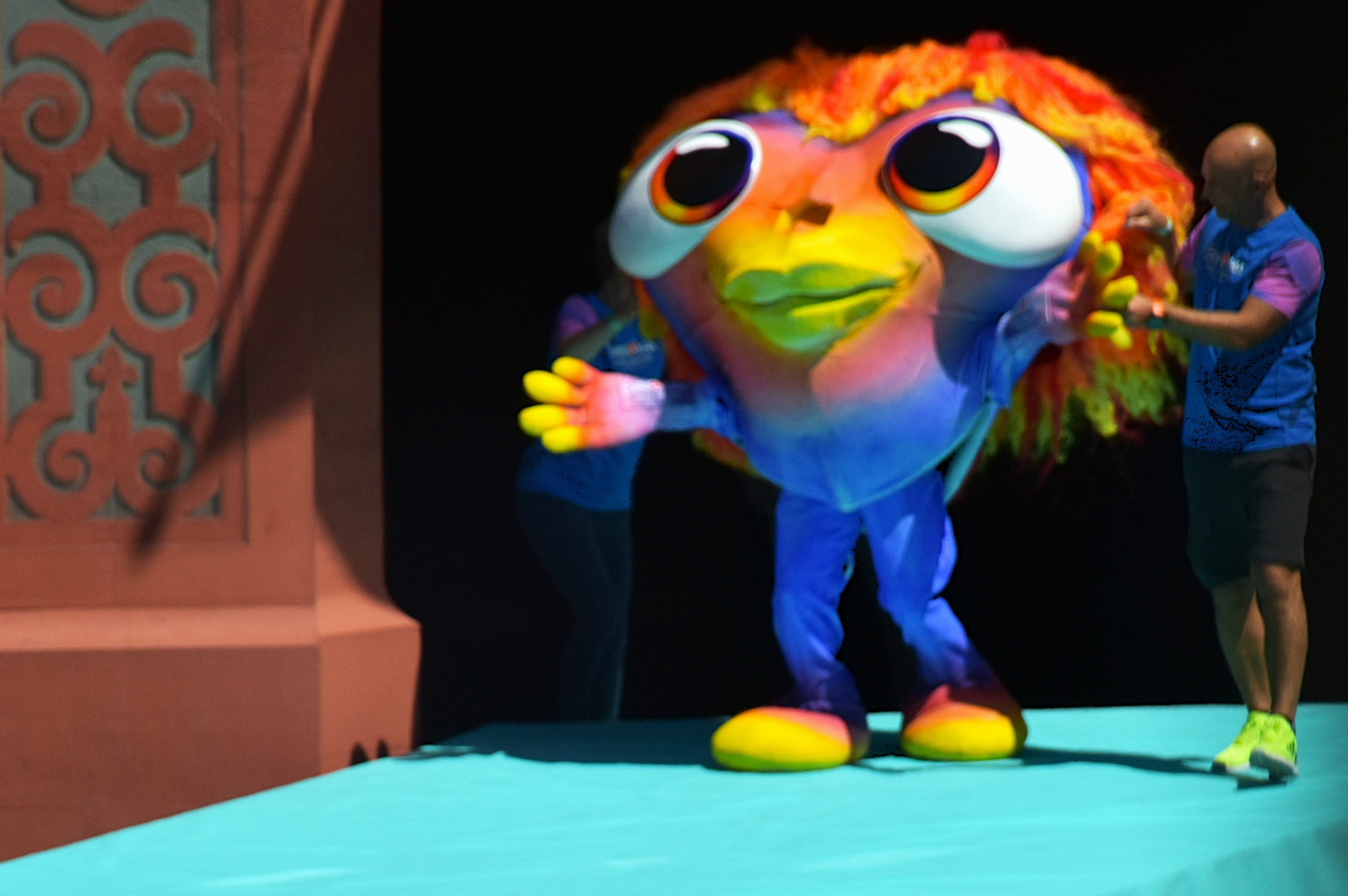
Lumo, mascot of the 2025 contest

On 26 February 2025, SRG SSR unveiled a mascot for the 2025 contest, in a first for the event since 1992. Named "Lumo" and designed by Lynn Brunner of the Basel Academy of Art and Design, it is an anthropomorphic heart shape with orange curly hair.

Swiss fashion designer Kevin Germanier served as head of costume for the contest, designing the outfits worn by the three presenters and supplying around 200 costumes across the two semi-finals and the final; the competing artists' outfits were not part of his remit.

=== Postcards ===
The "postcards" were short video introductions shown on television while the stage is being prepared for the next entry. Filmed between January and April 2025 and produced by the Zurich-based company Dynamic Frame, with creative direction by Jen Ries and Luca Zurfluh, the postcards featured the competing artists taking part in local activities across Switzerland. The following locations were used for each participating country:

- Albania – Basel, Basel-Stadt
- Armenia – Betlis, Canton of St. Gallen
- Australia – Bern, Canton of Bern
- Austria – Emmental, Canton of Bern
- Azerbaijan – Zurich, Canton of Zurich
- Belgium – Jungfraujoch, Valais and Bern
- Croatia – Zermatt, Valais
- Cyprus – Basel, Basel-Stadt
- Czechia – Riburg, Aargau
- Denmark – Gruyères, Fribourg
- Estonia – Basel, Basel-Stadt
- Finland – Appenzell, Appenzell Innerrhoden
- France – Ascona, Ticino
- Georgia – Geneva, Canton of Geneva
- Germany – Basel, Basel-Stadt
- Greece – Peccia, Ticino
- Iceland – Rapperswil, St. Gallen
- Ireland – CERN, Meyrin, Canton of Geneva
- Israel – Morcote, Ticino
- Italy – Basel, Basel-Stadt
- Latvia – Zurich, Canton of Zurich
- Lithuania – Basel, Basel-Stadt
- Luxembourg – Rugisbalm, Nidwalden
- Malta – Le Noirmont, Canton of Jura
- Montenegro – Zurich, Canton of Zurich
- Netherlands – Filisur, Grisons
- Norway – Egnach, Thurgau
- Poland – Laax, Grisons
- Portugal – Lavaux, Vaud
- San Marino – Bruzella, Ticino
- Serbia – Vaz/Obervaz, Grisons
- Slovenia – Alp Raguta, Grisons
- Spain – Lucerne, Canton of Lucerne
- Sweden – Magglingen, Canton of Bern
- Switzerland – Basel, Basel-Stadt
- Ukraine – Basel, Basel-Stadt
- United Kingdom – Zermatt, Valais

=== Presenters ===
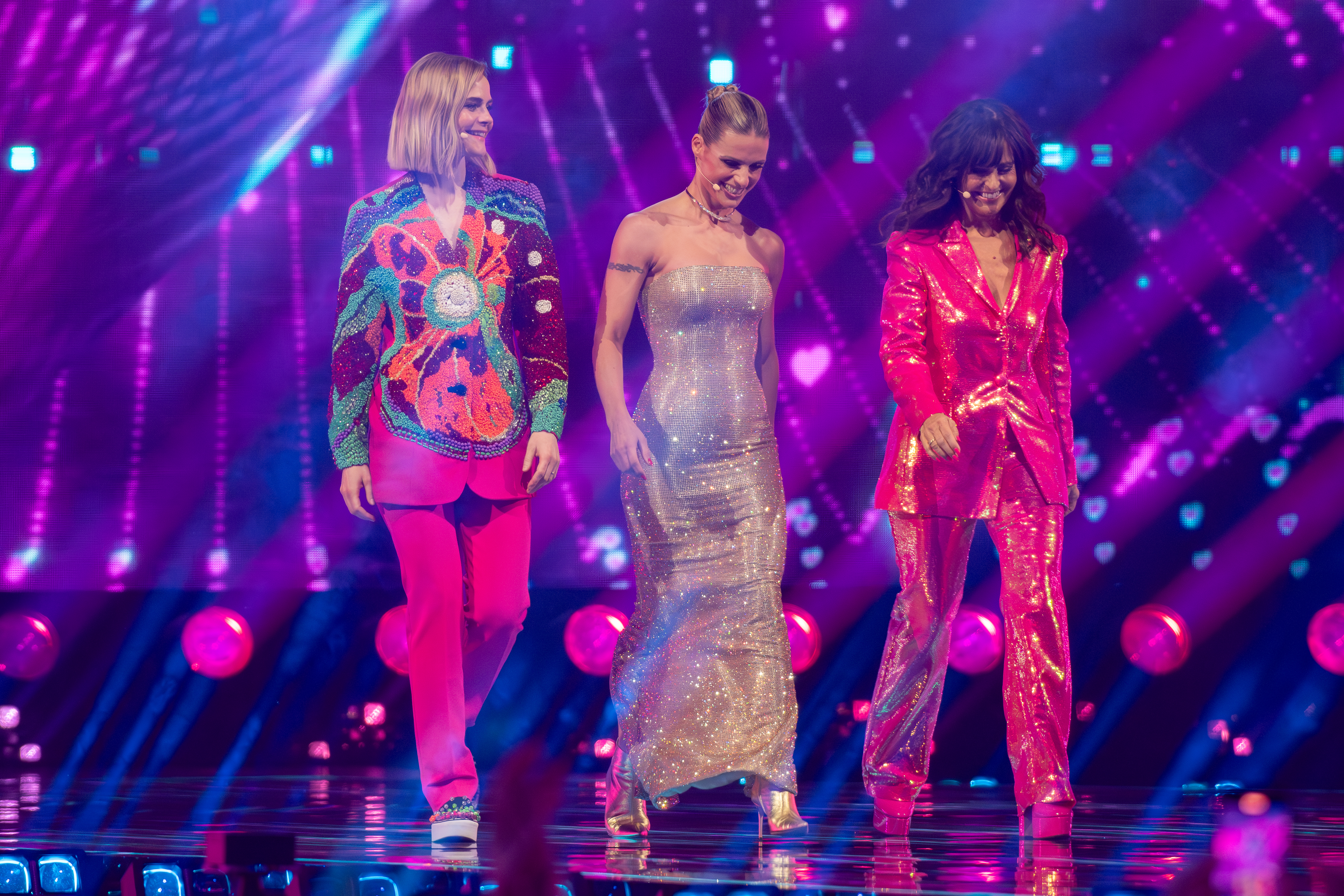
Presenters as they appeared in the final, from left to right: Hazel Brugger, Michelle Hunziker, and Sandra Studer

The Swiss comedian Hazel Brugger and singer Sandra Studer – who represented Switzerland in 1991 – were announced as the presenters of the 2025 contest on 20 January 2025, and they hosted all three shows of the event; Swiss-Italian television presenter Michelle Hunziker joined them for the final. Jan van Ditzhuijzen and Tanja Dankner provided commentary for the "Turquoise Carpet" and opening ceremony events, with Joël von Mutzenbecher welcoming the competing artists at the start of the carpet and Odette Hella'Grand interviewing them at the end of the route. The public screening of the final at St. Jakob-Park was hosted by Sven Epiney and Mélanie Freymond, both of whom also announced the points of the Swiss jury from the stadium. Epiney additionally moderated the winner's press conference.

=== Semi-final allocation draw ===
Results of the semi-final allocation draw: Participating countries in the first semi-final Pre-qualified for the final but also voting in the first semi-final Participating countries in the second semi-final Pre-qualified for the final but also voting in the second semi-final

The draw to determine the participating countries' semi-finals took place on 28 January 2025 at 12:30 CET, at the auditorium of the Kunstmuseum Basel. The thirty-one semi-finalists were divided over five pots, based on historical voting patterns, with the purpose of reducing the chance of bloc voting and increasing suspense in the semi-finals. The draw also determined which semi-final each of the six automatic qualifiers – host country Switzerland and "Big Five" countries (France, Germany, Italy, Spain and the United Kingdom) – would vote in, be required to broadcast, and perform its entry in a non-competitive capacity. The ceremony was hosted by Jennifer Bosshard and Jan van Ditzhuijzen, and included the symbolic transfer of duties from Carina Nilsson, the president of previous host city Malmö's council, to Conradin Cramer, the president of the Basel-Stadt government. The host city insignia, which had traditionally been used since 2007, was replaced by a dress gifted by Nilsson to Cramer, the first "friendship gift" that would replace the host city insignia from this year.

Pot 1	Pot 2	Pot 3	Pot 4	Pot 5
Belgium; Czechia; Estonia; Latvia; Lithuania; Luxembourg; Netherlands	Armenia; Azerbaijan; Georgia; Israel; Poland; Ukraine	Albania; Austria; Croatia; Montenegro; Serbia; Slovenia	Cyprus; Greece; Ireland; Malta; Portugal; San Marino	Australia; Denmark; Finland; Iceland; Norway; Sweden

=== Flag policy ===
The flag policy was updated for 2025, with competing artists allowed to display only the flag of the country they represent in official capacities – including onstage, in the green room, Turquoise Carpet, and the Eurovision Village. On the other hand, the policy overturned a previous ban for the audience, allowing the display of any flag permitted under Swiss law, including pride flags, Palestinian flags, and the flag of Europe. While accepting the policy, Dutch broadcaster AVROTROS stated that it would push for changes for the following year's contest; the broadcaster had earlier met with LGBTQ+ advocacy group COC Nederland, which called the ban on pride flags for competing artists "outrageously ridiculous". Glenn Micallef, the European Union (EU)'s cultural commissioner, also criticised similar restrictions on displaying the EU flag for competing artists.

== Contest overview ==
Changes to the process of revealing the semi-final qualifiers were implemented for this edition only. For the first nine qualifiers, countries would be called in sets of three via split-screen, with one progressing to the final at a time. The final qualifier would then be announced while the hosts are onscreen.

=== Semi-final 1 ===
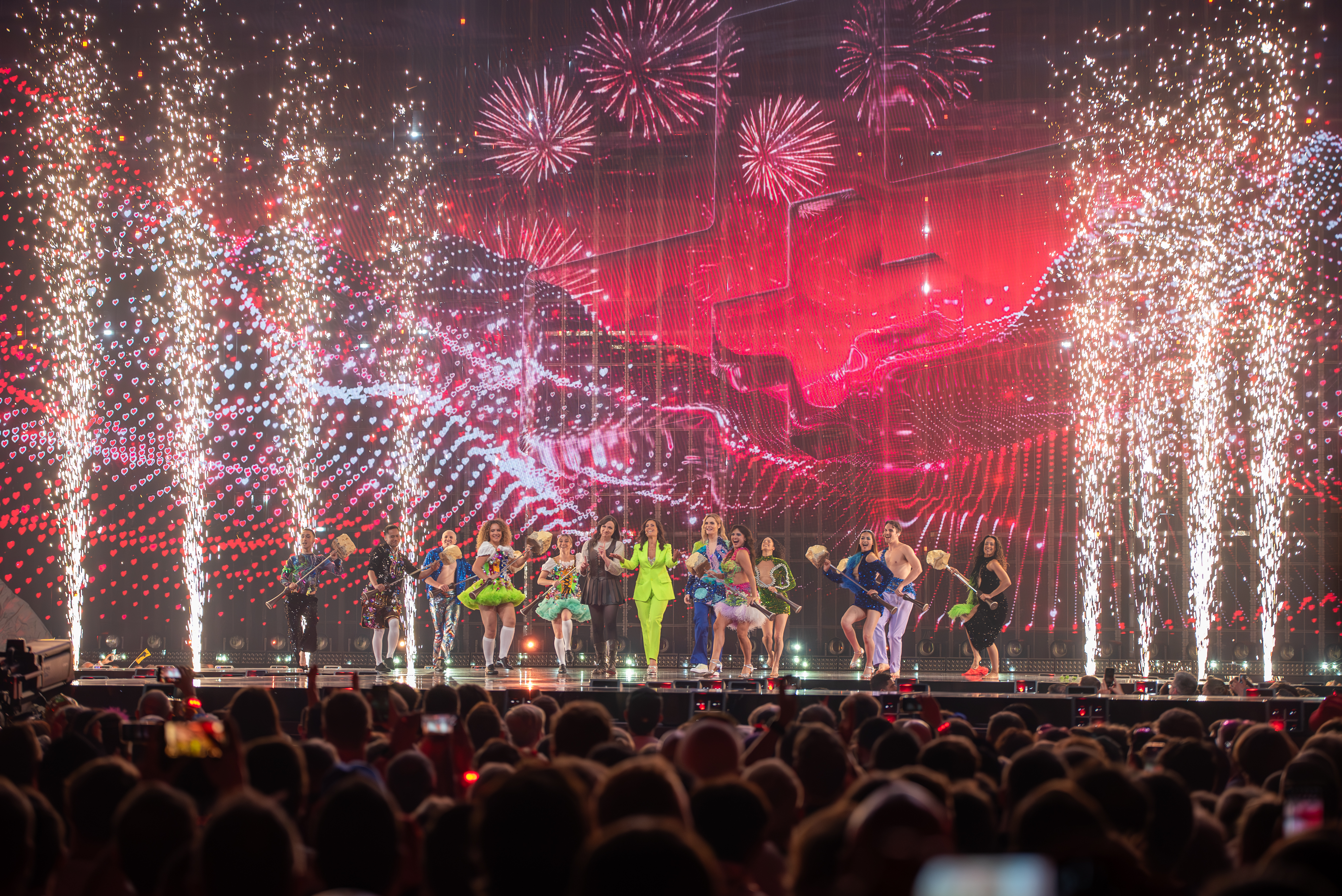
Presenters Hazel Brugger and Sandra Studer, alongside Petra Mede, performed the musical number "Made in Switzerland" as an interval act in the first semi-final.

The first semi-final took place on 13 May 2025 at 21:00 CEST. Fifteen countries competed in the first semi-final. Those countries plus Italy, Spain and Switzerland, as well as non-participating countries under an aggregated "Rest of the World" vote, voted in this semi-final. The running order (R/O) was determined by the contest producers and was announced publicly on 27 March. In addition to the competing entries, Spain, Italy and Switzerland performed their entries during the show, appearing on stage after the entries from Estonia, Belgium and Croatia, respectively. Ukraine was awarded the most points in the semi-final, and qualified for the final alongside, in order of points total, Albania, the Netherlands, Sweden, Estonia, Iceland, Poland, Norway, Portugal, and San Marino. The countries that failed to reach the final were Cyprus, Croatia, Slovenia, Belgium, and Azerbaijan.

This semi-final was opened by a troupe of dancers, yodelers and alphorn players performing Swiss-style renditions of four previous winning songs: "Tattoo" (2023), "Arcade" (2019), "Waterloo" (1974), and "The Code" (2024). The interval acts included "Made in Switzerland", a musical number performed by presenters Hazel Brugger and Sandra Studer which highlights and satirises Swiss stereotypes and inventions, written by Christian Knecht and Lukas Hobi, with an appearance by Petra Mede, who had previously hosted the contest in 2013, 2016, and 2024; and four former participants from 2024 – Greece's Marina Satti, Ukraine's Jerry Heil, Portugal's Iolanda, and Lithuania's Silvester Belt – performing the 1988 Swiss winning entry "Ne partez pas sans moi", preceded by a pre-recorded message from the song's original performer, Céline Dion. Jørgen Olsen, who won for Denmark in 2000 alongside his brother Niels Olsen, performed that year's winning song "Fly on the Wings of Love" after the qualifiers were announced, with lyrical changes referencing the contest's permanent slogan "United by Music".

Qualifiers

First semi-final of the Eurovision Song Contest 2025
R/O	Country	Artist	Song	Points	Place
1	Iceland	Væb	"Róa"	97	6
2	Poland	Justyna Steczkowska	"Gaja"	85	7
3	Slovenia	Klemen	"How Much Time Do We Have Left"	23	13
4	Estonia	Tommy Cash	"Espresso Macchiato"	113	5
5	Ukraine	Ziferblat	"Bird of Pray"	137	1
6	Sweden	KAJ	"Bara bada bastu"	118	4
7	Portugal	Napa	"Deslocado"	56	9
8	Norway	Kyle Alessandro	"Lighter"	82	8
9	Belgium	Red Sebastian	"Strobe Lights"	23	14
10	Azerbaijan	Mamagama	"Run with U"	7	15
11	San Marino	Gabry Ponte	"Tutta l'Italia"	46	10
12	Albania	Shkodra Elektronike	"Zjerm"	122	2
13	Netherlands	Claude	"C'est la vie"	121	3
14	Croatia	Marko Bošnjak	"Poison Cake"	28	12
15	Cyprus	Theo Evan	"Shh"	44	11

=== Semi-final 2 ===
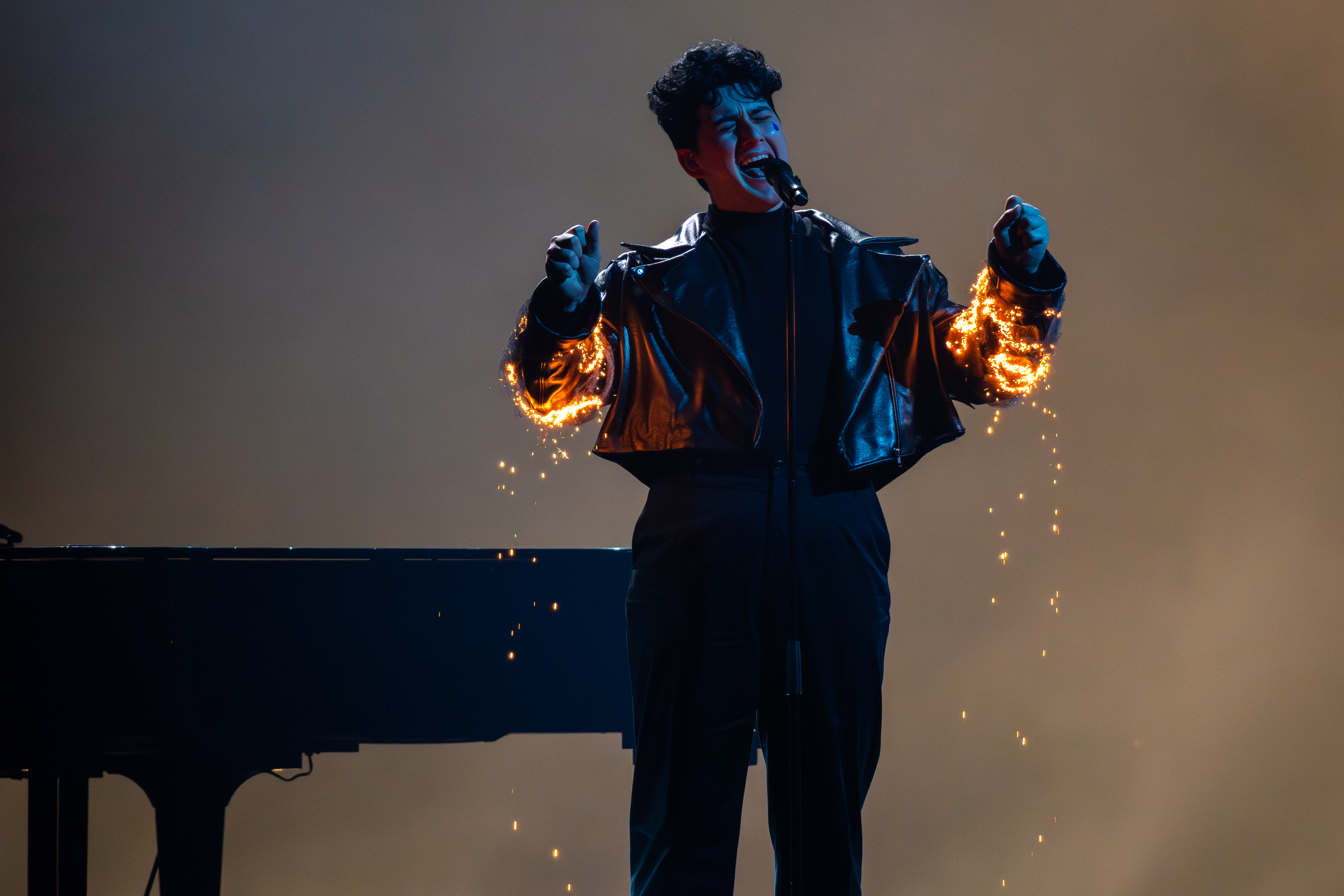
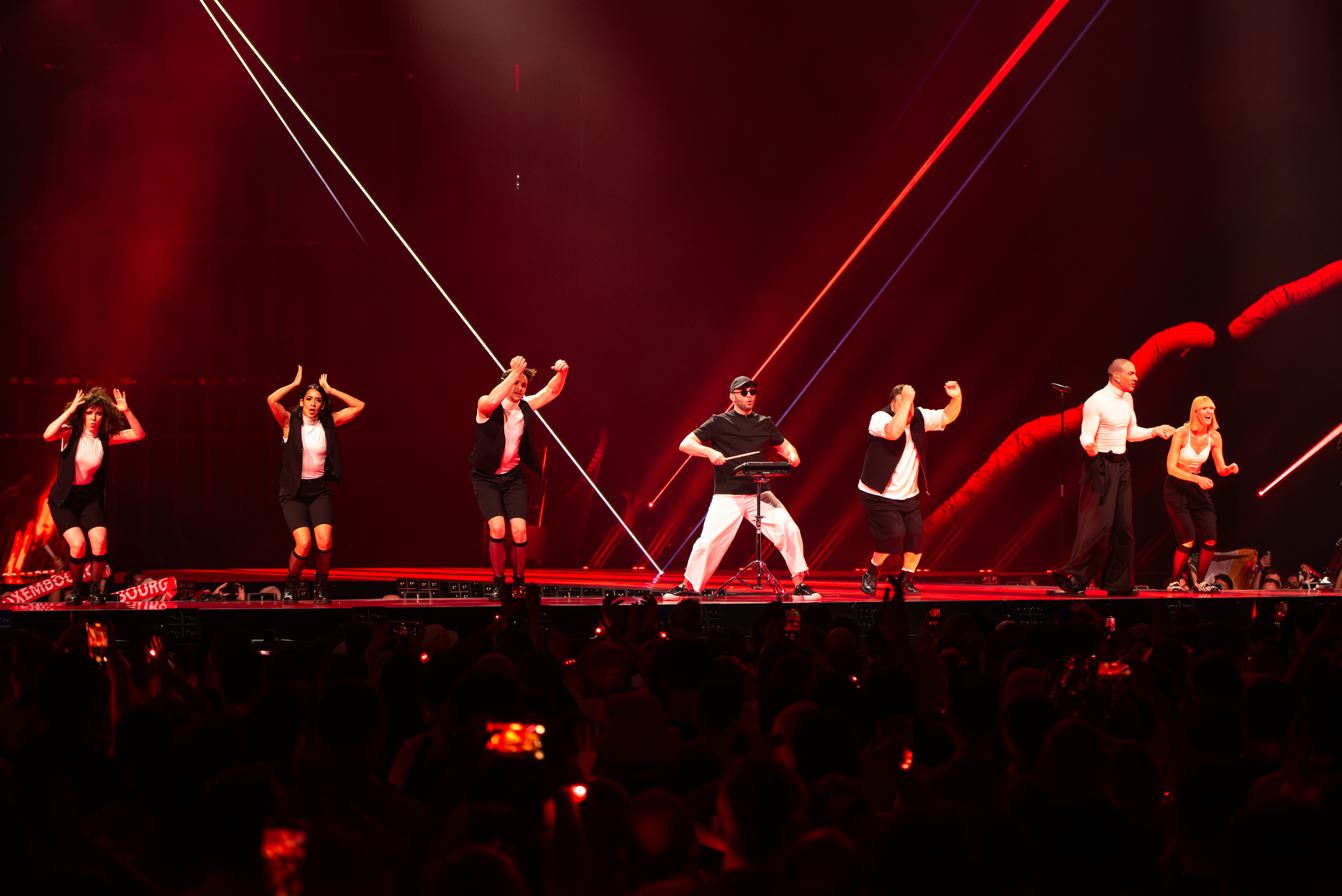
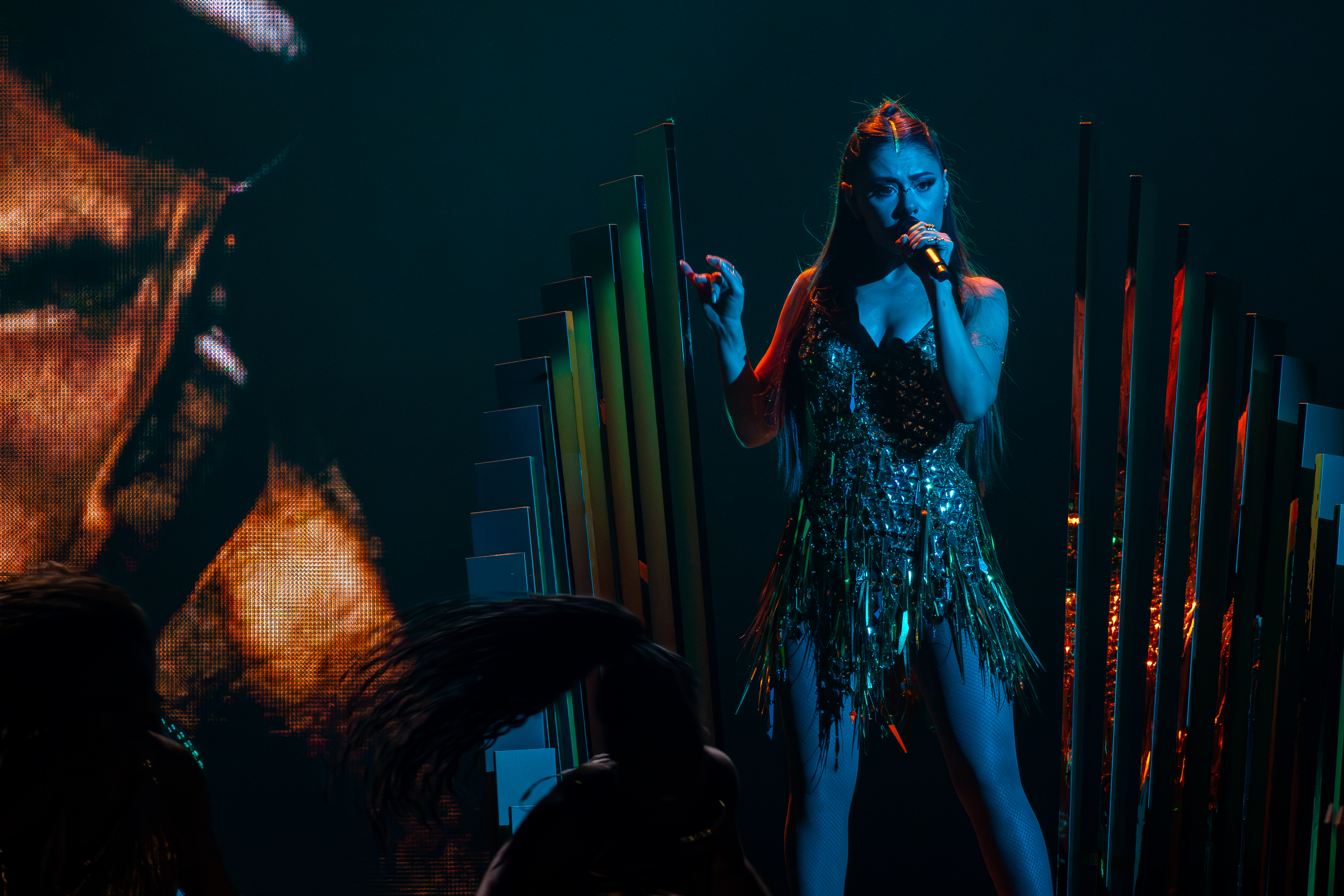
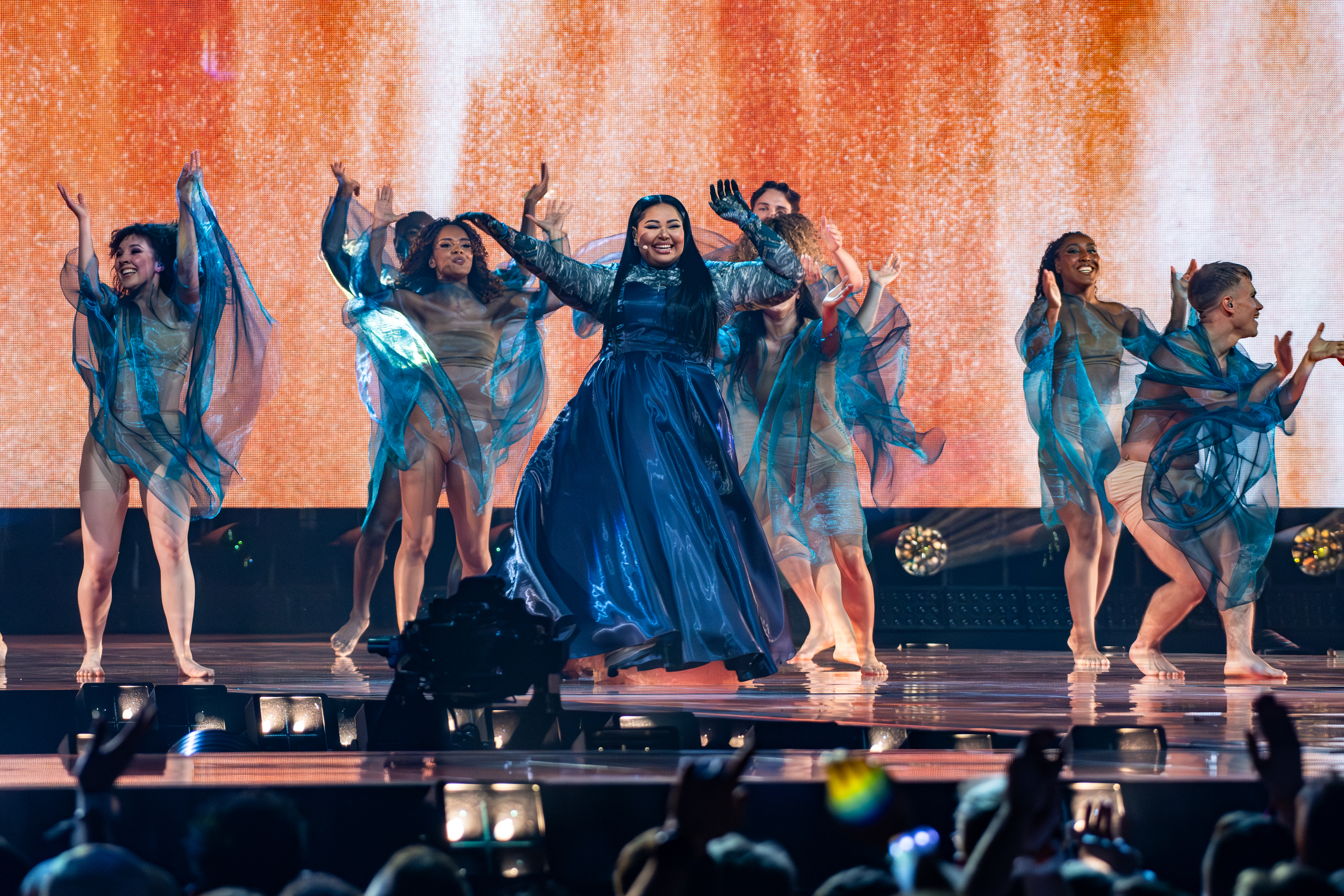
Gjon's Tears, The Roop, Efendi, and Destiny performed their intended entries for the cancelled 2020 contest as an interval act in the second semi-final.

The second semi-final took place on 15 May 2025 at 21:00 CEST. Sixteen countries competed in the second semi-final. Those countries plus France, Germany and the United Kingdom, as well as non-participating countries under an aggregated "Rest of the World" vote, voted in this semi-final. The running order (R/O) was determined by the contest producers and was announced publicly on 27 March. In addition to the competing entries, the United Kingdom, France and Germany performed their entries during the show, appearing on stage after the entries from Austria, Georgia and Israel, respectively. Israel was awarded the most points in the semi-final, and qualified for the final alongside, in order of points total, Latvia, Finland, Greece, Austria, Lithuania, Luxembourg, Denmark, Malta, and Armenia. The countries that failed to reach the final were Australia, Czechia, Ireland, Serbia, Georgia, and Montenegro.

This semi-final was opened by a pre-recorded monologue by Philip, a Eurovision fan, about the things he loves about the contest; he also appeared live on stage. The interval acts included a presentation on Swiss punctuality backed by a dance troupe performing an interpretive routine titled "On Time"; and four former participants performing their intended entries for the cancelled 2020 contest – Switzerland's Gjon's Tears with "Répondez-moi", Lithuania's The Roop with "On Fire", Azerbaijan's Efendi with "Cleopatra", and Malta's Destiny with "All of My Love". Co-presenter Sandra Studer performed the winning song for Italy in 1990, "Insieme: 1992", after the qualifiers were announced.

Qualifiers

Second semi-final of the Eurovision Song Contest 2025
R/O	Country	Artist	Song	Points	Place
1	Australia	Go-Jo	"Milkshake Man"	41	11
2	Montenegro	Nina Žižić	"Dobrodošli"	12	16
3	Ireland	Emmy	"Laika Party"	28	13
4	Latvia	Tautumeitas	"Bur man laimi"	130	2
5	Armenia	Parg	"Survivor"	51	10
6	Austria	JJ	"Wasted Love"	104	5
7	Greece	Klavdia	"Asteromata"	112	4
8	Lithuania	Katarsis	"Tavo akys"	103	6
9	Malta	Miriana Conte	"Serving"	53	9
10	Georgia	Mariam Shengelia	"Freedom"	28	15
11	Denmark	Sissal	"Hallucination"	61	8
12	Czechia	Adonxs	"Kiss Kiss Goodbye"	29	12
13	Luxembourg	Laura Thorn	"La poupée monte le son"	62	7
14	Israel	Yuval Raphael	"New Day Will Rise"	203	1
15	Serbia	Princ	"Mila"	28	14
16	Finland	Erika Vikman	"Ich komme"	115	3

=== Final ===
The final took place on 17 May 2025 at 21:00 CEST and featured 26 competing countries. All 37 participating countries with jury and televote, as well as non-participating countries under an aggregated "Rest of the World" online vote, voted in the final. The running order (R/O) of the host nation was determined by a random draw on 17 March during the annual meeting of heads of the participating delegations. The running order for the remaining finalists was determined by the contest producers following the second semi-final.

Austria won the contest with the song "Wasted Love", performed by JJ and written by him along with Teodora Špirić and Thomas Thurner. Austria won with 436 points, also winning the jury vote. It was the country's third win in the contest, following prior victories in 1966 and 2014. Israel came second with 357 points and won the televote, with Estonia, Sweden, Italy, Greece, France, Albania, Ukraine, and Switzerland completing the top ten. Luxembourg, Denmark, Spain, Iceland, and San Marino occupied the bottom five positions.

The final was opened by Nemo performing their winning song in 2024, "The Code", followed by the flag parade, introducing all twenty-six finalists, backed by the Top Secret Drum Corps. In a break between the competing songs, co-presenter Sandra Studer performed a snippet of her entry for Switzerland in 1991, "Canzone per te", while co-presenter Michelle Hunziker performed a snippet of the Italian entry in 1958, "Nel blu, dipinto di blu". The interval acts included four former Swiss participants performing their competing songs: Peter, Sue and Marc with their 1981 entry "Io senza te", (Note: Peter Reber and Marc Dietrich were the only members of the group to perform, joined by their respective children Nina Reber and Bruno Dietrich.) Paola with her 1980 entry "Cinéma", Luca Hänni with his 2019 entry "She Got Me", and Gjon's Tears with his 2021 entry "Tout l'univers"; Baby Lasagna, who represented Croatia in 2024, and Käärijä, who represented Finland in 2023, performing a mashup of their respective competing songs "Rim Tim Tagi Dim" and "Cha Cha Cha" followed by their new collaborative single "#Eurodab"; and Nemo performing their new single "Unexplainable". French newspaper Le Parisien reported that Céline Dion was also slated to perform her winning song for Switzerland in 1988, "Ne partez pas sans moi", but she withdrew at the last minute due to health issues; this was denied by her management.

Winner

Final of the Eurovision Song Contest 2025
R/O	Country	Artist	Song	Points	Place
1	Norway	Kyle Alessandro	"Lighter"	89	18
2	Luxembourg	Laura Thorn	"La poupée monte le son"	47	22
3	Estonia	Tommy Cash	"Espresso Macchiato"	356	3
4	Israel	Yuval Raphael	"New Day Will Rise"	357	2
5	Lithuania	Katarsis	"Tavo akys"	96	16
6	Spain	Melody	"Esa diva"	37	24
7	Ukraine	Ziferblat	"Bird of Pray"	218	9
8	United Kingdom	Remember Monday	"What the Hell Just Happened?"	88	19
9	Austria	JJ	"Wasted Love"	436	1
10	Iceland	Væb	"Róa"	33	25
11	Latvia	Tautumeitas	"Bur man laimi"	158	13
12	Netherlands	Claude	"C'est la vie"	175	12
13	Finland	Erika Vikman	"Ich komme"	196	11
14	Italy	Lucio Corsi	"Volevo essere un duro"	256	5
15	Poland	Justyna Steczkowska	"Gaja"	156	14
16	Germany	Abor & Tynna	"Baller"	151	15
17	Greece	Klavdia	"Asteromata"	231	6
18	Armenia	Parg	"Survivor"	72	20
19	Switzerland	Zoë Më	"Voyage"	214	10
20	Malta	Miriana Conte	"Serving"	91	17
21	Portugal	Napa	"Deslocado"	50	21
22	Denmark	Sissal	"Hallucination"	47	23
23	Sweden	KAJ	"Bara bada bastu"	321	4
24	France	Louane	"Maman"	230	7
25	San Marino	Gabry Ponte	"Tutta l'Italia"	27	26
26	Albania	Shkodra Elektronike	"Zjerm"	218	8

==== Spokespersons ====
The spokespersons announced the 12-point score from their respective country's national jury in the following order:

1. Sweden – Keyyo
2. Azerbaijan – Safura
3. Malta – Ingrid Sammut
4. Netherlands – Chantal Janzen
5. Slovenia – Lorella Flego
6. Armenia – Lusine Tovmasyan
7. Luxembourg – Fabienne Zwally
8. San Marino – Senhit
9. Ukraine – Jerry Heil
10. Norway – Tom Hugo
11. Austria – Philipp Hansa
12. France – Émilie Mazoyer
13. Italy – Topo Gigio
14. Portugal – Iolanda
15. Denmark – Sara Bro
16. Croatia – Doris Pinčić
17. Latvia – Dons
18. Ireland – Nicky Byrne
19. Poland – Aleksandra Budka
20. Montenegro – Marko Vukčević
21. Greece – Jenny Theona
22. Serbia – Dragana Kosjerina
23. Czechia – Radka Rosická
24. United Kingdom – Sophie Ellis-Bextor
25. Spain – Chanel
26. Finland – Jasmin Beloued
27. Australia – Silia Kapsis
28. Germany – Michael Schulte
29. Belgium – Manu Van Acker
30. Israel – Eden Golan
31. Albania – Andri Xhahu
32. Lithuania – Silvester Belt
33. Iceland – Hera Björk
34. Georgia – Nutsa Buzaladze
35. Cyprus – Loukas Hamatsos
36. Estonia – Kristjan Jakobson
37. Switzerland – Mélanie Freymond and Sven Epiney

== Detailed voting results ==
=== Semi-final 1 ===
The ten qualifiers from the first semi-final were determined solely by televoting, with the exception of San Marino which did not organise a televote, and thus used the votes of its back-up jury. All fifteen countries competing in the first semi-final voted, alongside Italy, Spain, Switzerland, and the aggregated Rest of the World vote. The ten qualifying countries were announced in no particular order, and the full results were published after the final was held.

Qualifiers

Detailed voting results of the first semi-final of the Eurovision Song Contest 2025
Voting procedure used: 100% Televoting 100% Jury vote		Total score	Iceland	Poland	Slovenia	Estonia	Ukraine	Sweden	Portugal	Norway	Belgium	Azerbaijan	San Marino	Albania	Netherlands	Croatia	Cyprus	Italy	Spain	Switzerland	Rest of the World
Contestants	Iceland	97		6	5	7	2	12	2	8	5			5	10	7	7	4	5	4	8
Contestants	Poland	85	7				5	7	4	7	10	1		2	12	1	4	3	10	6	6
Contestants	Slovenia	23				3	1			1		2	8	1		6	1				
Contestants	Estonia	113	6	8	1		3	6	6	6	4	10	10	8	6	12	8	8	4	3	4
Contestants	Ukraine	137	4	12	8	8		4	12	5	6	7	6	10	8	4	12	7	12	2	10
Contestants	Sweden	118	12	7	4	12	4		7	12	8	4		6	7	8	5	6	2	7	7
Contestants	Portugal	56	1	3	3	6	7	2		3	3		4		3			1	7	8	5
Contestants	Norway	82	10	5	2	5	12	5	3		2	8		3	2	5	6	2	8	1	3
Contestants	Belgium	23	5			1							12		5						
Contestants	Azerbaijan	7											7								
Contestants	San Marino	46	3	1		4		3	1	2	1	5		4		2	2	12	1	5	
Contestants	Albania	122	2	10	7	2	10	10	8	4	7	6	1		4	10	3	10	6	10	12
Contestants	Netherlands	121	8	4	6	10	6	8	10	10	12	3	3	7		3	10	5	3	12	1
Contestants	Croatia	28		2	12		8	1					2		1						2
Contestants	Cyprus	44			10				5			12	5	12							

==== 12 points ====
Below is a summary of all 12 points received in the first semi-final. Ukraine received the maximum score of 12 points from four countries, while Sweden received three sets of 12 points. Both Cyprus and the Netherlands received two sets of 12 points, while Albania, Belgium, Croatia, Estonia, Iceland, Norway, Poland and San Marino received one each.

12 points awarded in the first semi-final of the Eurovision Song Contest 2025
#	Recipient	Countries giving 12 points
4	Ukraine	Cyprus, Spain, Poland, Portugal
3	Sweden	Estonia, Iceland, Norway
2	Cyprus	Albania, Azerbaijan
2	Netherlands	Belgium, Switzerland
1	Albania	Rest of the World
1	Belgium	San Marino
1	Croatia	Slovenia
1	Estonia	Croatia
1	Iceland	Sweden
1	Norway	Ukraine
1	Poland	Netherlands
1	San Marino	Italy

=== Semi-final 2 ===
The ten qualifiers from the second semi-final were determined solely by televoting. All sixteen countries competing in the second semi-final voted, alongside France, Germany, the United Kingdom, and the aggregated Rest of the World vote. The ten qualifying countries were announced in no particular order, and the full results were published after the final was held.

Qualifiers

Detailed voting results of the second semi-final of the Eurovision Song Contest 2025
Voting procedure used: 100% Televoting		Total score	Australia	Montenegro	Ireland	Latvia	Armenia	Austria	Greece	Lithuania	Malta	Georgia	Denmark	Czechia	Luxembourg	Israel	Serbia	Finland	France	Germany	United Kingdom	Rest of the World
Contestants	Australia	41			3	6		2		6	5	1	3	1				5		2	5	2
Contestants	Montenegro	12															12					
Contestants	Ireland	28	2			4				2	6		2		2			2			7	1
Contestants	Latvia	130	7	3	8		4	8	3	12	3	7	8	10	7	4	4	10	6	8	8	10
Contestants	Armenia	51				1			8	5	1	12		3		12	1		8			
Contestants	Austria	104	3	7	6	7	8		10	8	7	6	7	6	4	6	6	7	1	5		
Contestants	Greece	112	5	10	1		12	7			8	5	4	4	10	8	10	1	7	10	3	7
Contestants	Lithuania	103	1	5	10	12	1		4		2	8	6	8	8		5	6	5	7	10	5
Contestants	Malta	53	8	4	4		7	1	6			2	1	2	3	5	2	3			2	3
Contestants	Georgia	28				3	10		5	3						7						
Contestants	Denmark	61	6	2	5	2	3	3		4	4			5	1	1		8	3	4	6	4
Contestants	Czechia	29					5	5				3			5	3						8
Contestants	Luxembourg	62	4	1	2	5		6	7	1			5			10	3	4	10	3	1	
Contestants	Israel	203	12	8	12	10	2	12	12	10	12	10	12	12	12		7	12	12	12	12	12
Contestants	Serbia	28		12				10	1										4	1		
Contestants	Finland	115	10	6	7	8	6	4	2	7	10	4	10	7	6	2	8		2	6	4	6

==== 12 points ====
Below is a summary of all 12 points received in the second semi-final. Israel received the maximum score of 12 points from thirteen countries, followed by Armenia which received two sets of 12 points. Greece, Latvia, Lithuania, Montenegro and Serbia were each awarded one set of 12 points.

12 points awarded in the second semi-final of the Eurovision Song Contest 2025
#	Recipient	Countries giving 12 points
13	Israel	Australia, Austria, Czechia, Denmark, Finland, France, Germany, Greece, Ireland, Luxembourg, Malta, Rest of the World, United Kingdom
2	Armenia	Israel, Georgia
1	Greece	Armenia
1	Latvia	Lithuania
1	Lithuania	Latvia
1	Montenegro	Serbia
1	Serbia	Montenegro

=== Final ===
The results of the final were determined by televoting and jury voting in all thirty-seven participating countries, plus the Rest of the World aggregate public vote. The announcement of the jury points was conducted by each country individually, with the country's spokesperson announcing their jury's favorite entry that received 12 points, with the remaining points shown on screen. Following the completion of the jury points announcement, the public points were announced as an aggregate by the contest hosts in ascending order starting from the country which received the fewest points from the jury.

Winner

Split results
Place	Combined		Jury		Televoting	
Place	Country	Points	Country	Points	Country	Points
1	Austria	436	Austria	258	Israel	297
2	Israel	357	Switzerland	214	Estonia	258
3	Estonia	356	France	180	Sweden	195
4	Sweden	321	Italy	159	Austria	178
5	Italy	256	Netherlands	133	Albania	173
6	Greece	231	Sweden	126	Ukraine	158
7	France	230	Latvia	116	Poland	139
8	Albania	218 (Note: Despite finishing with the same number of points as Ukraine, Albania is deemed to have finished 8th in the combined result due to receiving a greater number of points in the televote.)	Greece	105	Greece	126
9	Ukraine	218	Estonia	98	Finland	108
10	Switzerland	214	United Kingdom	88 (Note: Despite finishing with the same number of points as Finland, the United Kingdom is deemed to have finished 10th in the jury voting due to receiving points from more countries.)	Italy	97
11	Finland	196	Finland	88	Germany	74
12	Netherlands	175	Malta	83	Norway	67
13	Latvia	158	Germany	77	Lithuania	62
14	Poland	156	Ukraine	60 (Note: Despite finishing with the same number of points as Israel, Ukraine is deemed to have finished 14th in the jury voting due to receiving points from more countries.)	France	50
15	Germany	151	Israel	60	Netherlands	42 (Note: Despite finishing with the same number of points as Latvia, Netherlands is deemed to have finished 15th in the televoting due to receiving points from more countries.)
16	Lithuania	96	Albania	45 (Note: Despite finishing with the same number of points as Denmark, Albania is deemed to have finished 16th in the jury voting due to receiving points from more countries.)	Latvia	42
17	Malta	91	Denmark	45	Iceland	33
18	Norway	89	Armenia	42	Armenia	30
19	United Kingdom	88	Portugal	37	Luxembourg	24
20	Armenia	72	Lithuania	34	San Marino	18
21	Portugal	50	Spain	27	Portugal	13
22	Luxembourg	47 (Note: Despite finishing with the same number of points as Denmark, Luxembourg is deemed to have finished 22nd in the combined result due to receiving a greater number of points in the televote.)	Luxembourg	23	Spain	10
23	Denmark	47	Norway	22	Malta	8
24	Spain	37	Poland	17	Denmark	2
25	Iceland	33	San Marino	9	United Kingdom	0 (Note: Despite both finishing with 0 points, tiebreaking rules put the United Kingdom in 25th place and Switzerland 26th due to their running order positions.)
26	San Marino	27	Iceland	0	Switzerland	0

Detailed jury voting results of the final of the Eurovision Song Contest 2025
Voting procedure used: 100% Televoting; 100% Jury vote		Total score	Jury vote score	Televoting score	Jury vote																																				
Voting procedure used: 100% Televoting; 100% Jury vote		Total score	Jury vote score	Televoting score	Sweden	Azerbaijan	Malta	Netherlands	Slovenia	Armenia	Luxembourg	San Marino	Ukraine	Norway	Austria	France	Italy	Portugal	Denmark	Croatia	Latvia	Ireland	Poland	Montenegro	Greece	Serbia	Czechia	United Kingdom	Spain	Finland	Australia	Germany	Belgium	Israel	Albania	Lithuania	Iceland	Georgia	Cyprus	Estonia	Switzerland
Contestants	Norway	89	22	67	4				2											1			2				6					1					6				
Contestants	Luxembourg	47	23	24				6					3		1						3			4				4						2							
Contestants	Estonia	356	98	258		7	3		7	2	3	7	5	4	3		10	3		5	1					3		3		4	3		10			7	3				5
Contestants	Israel	357	60	297		12		5			1		2			7			3	6		7			1					2		3			5			1	5		
Contestants	Lithuania	96	34	62				4				3									7		6	3			5	6													
Contestants	Spain	37	27	10	2	5	5									5																			10						
Contestants	Ukraine	218	60	158	5	8			5	4		4		1			2	8	2	2						4			2					4		2		6			1
Contestants	United Kingdom	88	88	0							6	2	10	7	7		12	2	4			2	1				10		6	5							5			5	4
Contestants	Austria	436	258	178	12		7	12	10	8	10		1	12		4		6	5	10	12	12	7	8	10	8		8	7	12	7	12	12	6	7	4	8		7	7	7
Contestants	Iceland	33	0	33																																					
Contestants	Latvia	158	116	42				3		1	2	8	6	6	4			7	12	7						1		12			10		7	7		12		8		3	
Contestants	Netherlands	175	133	42	8	3			4	3	7			5	2	3		5				10	10	2	8		7		10				3		3	8	10	7	8	1	6
Contestants	Finland	196	88	108	6		6			10				8	12		1		6		10	4						5			2		4				1			10	3
Contestants	Italy	256	159	97		10	4		12			12	8			6		12	8	12			8		4		3		4			5	5	3		10	2	12	3	4	12
Contestants	Poland	156	17	139		4										1															5	2	2	1						2	
Contestants	Germany	151	77	74		2					4		12				8				2				5	10	12		3	1			1	10		5		2			
Contestants	Greece	231	105	126			10									8		1		4		3	4	12		6		1		3	12	6		12	6			5	12		
Contestants	Armenia	72	42	30			12									10			1		4	1		1	3	2								5				3			
Contestants	Switzerland	214	214	0	10	1	2	10	8	7	8	10	7	3		2	4	10	10	8	8		12	7	6	7			12	6	1	7	8		8	3	7	4	6	12	
Contestants	Malta	91	83	8	1					5		1			10		5				5	6		5			2	7	5	7	8	8		8							
Contestants	Portugal	50	37	13		6		7	1			6	4														4								1	6					2
Contestants	Denmark	47	45	2											8		7									5	1	10			4							10			
Contestants	Sweden	321	126	195			1	8	6	6	5			10	5				7	3		5			7					10	6	4	6		4	1	12		2	8	10
Contestants	France	230	180	50	7		8	2	3	12	12	5		2	6						6	8	3	6	12	12	8	2	8	8		10			12		4		10	6	8
Contestants	San Marino	27	9	18													6																		2				1		
Contestants	Albania	218	45	173	3			1								12	3	4					5	10	2				1										4		

Detailed televoting results of the final of the Eurovision Song Contest 2025
Voting procedure used: 100% Televoting; 100% Jury vote		Total score	Jury vote score	Televoting score	Televoting vote																																					
Voting procedure used: 100% Televoting; 100% Jury vote		Total score	Jury vote score	Televoting score	Sweden	Azerbaijan	Malta	Netherlands	Slovenia	Armenia	Luxembourg	San Marino	Ukraine	Norway	Austria	France	Italy	Portugal	Denmark	Croatia	Latvia	Ireland	Poland	Montenegro	Greece	Serbia	Czechia	United Kingdom	Spain	Finland	Australia	Germany	Belgium	Israel	Albania	Lithuania	Iceland	Georgia	Cyprus	Estonia	Switzerland	Rest of the World
Contestants	Norway	89	22	67		6	6		2	4			10				1			4	1		3		4	3	2		2							2	8	4	5			
Contestants	Luxembourg	47	23	24					4							1								8										3	8							
Contestants	Estonia	356	98	258	8	8	12	8	7	12	5	7	2	7	8		7	1	6	12	12	6	10	10	8	12	6	6	7	8	6	4	2	10	5	10	7	8	7		2	2
Contestants	Israel	357	60	297	12	12	5	12	6		12	10	1	10	7	12	8	12	8		7	10		7	7	2	10	12	12	10	12	12	12		7	3	4	7	10	2	12	12
Contestants	Lithuania	96	34	62							4		12	4					2		10	8	6					8		1								6		1		
Contestants	Spain	37	27	10														6				1																				3
Contestants	Ukraine	218	60	158	4	4		4	3			4		2		6	6	10	4	2	6	7	12	6			12		10	2		3		12		7		10	8	6		8
Contestants	United Kingdom	88	88	0																																						
Contestants	Austria	436	258	178		10	10	3	10	7		5	6	1		2	4	7	3	5	4	4	7	3	10	10	4		4	7	3	6	3	8	6	5	3	5	6		6	1
Contestants	Iceland	33	0	33	5				1					3	1				10	1										6		1								5		
Contestants	Latvia	158	116	42							1		8									3	2					3		3	2					12				8		
Contestants	Netherlands	175	133	42	2					2		2		5	3			3							6								5		1	1	6		1	4	1	
Contestants	Finland	196	88	108	10	5	7	6		1				6	2				5	7	3	5	1			6	3	4	6		10			1			5			10		5
Contestants	Italy	256	159	97	1		8	2	12			3	7		10	3		8		6	2			1								2	1		10	6				7	8	
Contestants	Poland	156	17	139	6		2	10			3	6	3	8	5	7	3		7			12					8	10	8		1	7	10				12		4		3	4
Contestants	Germany	151	77	74				1		5			5		12				1	3	5		5		3	5	1			5				5	4	8	1	2		3		
Contestants	Greece	231	105	126	3			5		8	10	12				4	2							4		8		2			7	10	6	7	12				12		7	7
Contestants	Armenia	72	42	30												8									2									6				12	2			
Contestants	Switzerland	214	214	0																																						
Contestants	Malta	91	83	8		1																				1		1			5											
Contestants	Portugal	50	37	13							8					5																										
Contestants	Denmark	47	45	2																																	2					
Contestants	Sweden	321	126	195		3	1	7	5	6	2	1	4	12	4		5	4	12	8	8	2	8	5	1	7	7	7	5	12	8	5	4	2	2	4	10	1		12	5	6
Contestants	France	230	180	50		2				10	6							5						2	5				1				8	4					3		4	
Contestants	San Marino	27	9	18			3										12																		3							
Contestants	Albania	218	45	173	7	7	4		8	3	7	8			6	10	10	2		10			4	12	12	4	5	5	3	4	4	8	7					3			10	10

==== 12 points ====
Below is a summary of all 12 points received in the final. In the jury vote, Austria received the maximum score from eight countries, followed by Italy and France with six and five sets of 12 points, respectively. Greece received four sets of 12 points, Latvia and Switzerland received three, Germany received two, and Albania, Armenia, Finland, Israel, Sweden and the United Kingdom were each awarded one set of 12 points. In the public vote, Israel received the maximum score of 12 points from twelve countries and the Rest of the World vote, followed by Estonia with five sets of 12 points, Sweden with four, Greece and Ukraine with three sets of 12 points each, Albania and Poland with two, and Armenia, Germany, Italy, Latvia, Lithuania and San Marino were each awarded one set of 12 points.

12 points awarded by juries in the final of the Eurovision Song Contest 2025
#	Recipient	Countries giving 12 points
8	Austria	Belgium, Finland, Germany, Ireland, Latvia, Netherlands, Norway, Sweden
6	Italy	Croatia, Georgia, Portugal, San Marino, Slovenia, Switzerland
5	France	Albania, Armenia, Greece, Luxembourg, Serbia
4	Greece	Australia, Cyprus, Israel, Montenegro
3	Latvia	Denmark, Lithuania, United Kingdom
3	Switzerland	Estonia, Poland, Spain
2	Germany	Czechia, Ukraine
1	Albania	France
1	Armenia	Malta
1	Finland	Austria
1	Israel	Azerbaijan
1	Sweden	Iceland
1	United Kingdom	Italy

12 points awarded by televoting in the final of the Eurovision Song Contest 2025
#	Recipient	Countries giving 12 points
13	Israel	Australia, Azerbaijan, Belgium, France, Germany, Luxembourg, Netherlands, Portugal, Rest of the World, Spain, Sweden, Switzerland, United Kingdom
5	Estonia	Armenia, Croatia, Latvia, Malta, Serbia
4	Sweden	Denmark, Estonia, Finland, Norway
3	Greece	Albania, Cyprus, San Marino
3	Ukraine	Czechia, Israel, Poland
2	Albania	Greece, Montenegro
2	Poland	Iceland, Ireland
1	Armenia	Georgia
1	Germany	Austria
1	Italy	Slovenia
1	Latvia	Lithuania
1	Lithuania	Ukraine
1	San Marino	Italy

== Broadcasts ==
All participating broadcasters may choose to have on-site or remote commentators providing insight and voting information to their local audience. Although they are required to, at minimum, show the final and semi-final in which their country votes, most broadcasters cover all three shows. Some non-participating broadcasters also air the contest. The Eurovision Song Contest YouTube channel provides international live streams with no commentary of all shows. The table below details the broadcasting plans and commentators for the countries that aired the contest. According to the EBU, in total 166 million people watched at least a minute of the television broadcasts, while the YouTube broadcasts culminatively garnered 19.9 million views over a seven-day period. Votes were received from 146 countries, including the 37 competing countries.

Broadcasters and commentators in participating countries
Country	Broadcaster	Channel(s)	Show(s)	Commentator(s)	Ref.
Albania	RTSH	RTSH 1, RTSH Muzikë, Radio Tirana	All shows	Andri Xhahu	
Armenia	AMPTV	Armenia 1	All shows	Hrachuhi Utmazyan and Hamlet Arakelyan	
Australia	SBS	SBS	All shows	Courtney Act and Tony Armstrong	
Austria	ORF	ORF 1	All shows	Andi Knoll	
Austria	ORF	FM4	Final	Jan Böhmermann and Olli Schulz	
Azerbaijan	İTV		All shows	Elnara Khalilova and Aga Nadirov	
Belgium	VRT	VRT 1	All shows	Dutch: Peter Van de Veire	
Belgium	VRT	Radio 2	Final	Unknown	
Belgium	RTBF	La Une	SF1/Final	French: Jean-Louis Lahaye and Joëlle Scoriels	
Belgium	RTBF	Tipik	SF2	French: Jean-Louis Lahaye and Joëlle Scoriels	
Croatia	HRT	HRT 1	All shows	Duško Ćurlić	
Croatia	HRT	HR 2	All shows	Duško Ćurlić	
Cyprus	CyBC	RIK 1, RIK Sat	All shows	Melina Karageorgiou and Alexandros Taramountas	
Cyprus	CyBC	RIK Trito	All shows	Melina Karageorgiou and Alexandros Taramountas	
Czechia	ČT	ČT1	Semi-finals	Ondřej Cikán	
Czechia	ČT	ČT1	Final	Ondřej Cikán and Aiko	
Denmark	DR	DR1	All shows	Ole Tøpholm	
Estonia	ERR	ETV	All shows	Estonian: Marko Reikop	
Estonia	ERR	ETV+	All shows	Russian: Julia Kalenda and Aleksandr Hobotov	
Finland	Yle	Yle TV1, TV Finland	All shows	Finnish: Mikko Silvennoinen; Swedish: Eva Frantz and Johan Lindroos	
Finland	Yle	Yle Areena	All shows	Northern Sámi: Aslak Paltto and Inari Sámi: Heli Huovinen	
Finland	Yle	Yle Areena	SF2/Final	Russian: Levan Tvaltvadze; Ukrainian: Galina Sergeyeva	
Finland	Yle	Yle Radio Suomi	Final	Finnish: Sanna Pirkkalainen and Toni Laaksonen	
Finland	Yle	Yle X3M	All shows	Swedish: Eva Frantz and Johan Lindroos	
France	France Télévisions	Culturebox	Semi-finals	Stéphane Bern	
France	France Télévisions	France 2	Final	Stéphane Bern and Laurence Boccolini	
Georgia	GPB	First Channel	All shows	Unknown	
Germany	ARD/NDR	One	Semi-finals	Thorsten Schorn	
Germany	ARD/NDR	Das Erste	Final	Thorsten Schorn	
Germany	ARD/RBB	Radio Eins	Final	Amelie Ernst and Max Spallek	
Greece	ERT	ERT1	All shows	Maria Kozakou and Giorgos Kapoutzidis	
Greece	ERT	Deftero Programma	All shows	Dimitris Meidanis	
Iceland	RÚV	RÚV	All shows	Guðrún Dís Emilsdóttir	
Iceland	RÚV	RÚV 2	SF1/Final	Icelandic Sign Language interpretation	
Iceland	RÚV	Rás 2	SF1	Guðrún Dís Emilsdóttir	
Iceland	RÚV	Rás 2	Final	Guðrún Dís Emilsdóttir and Gunnar Birgisson	
Ireland	RTÉ	RTÉ2	Semi-finals	Marty Whelan	
Ireland	RTÉ	RTÉ One	Final	Marty Whelan	
Israel	IPBC	Kan 11, Kan 88	Semi-finals	Asaf Liberman and Akiva Novick	
Israel	IPBC	Kan 11, Kan 88	Final	Asaf Liberman, Akiva Novick and Keren Peles	
Italy	RAI	Rai 2	Semi-finals	Gabriele Corsi and BigMama	
Italy	RAI	Rai 1	Final	Gabriele Corsi and BigMama	
Italy	RAI	Rai Radio 2	Final	Diletta Parlangeli and Matteo Osso	
Latvia	LSM	LTV1	Semi-finals	Toms Grēviņš	
Latvia	LSM	LTV1	Final	Toms Grēviņš and Marija Naumova	
Lithuania	LRT	LRT TV, LRT Radijas	All shows	Ramūnas Zilnys	
Luxembourg	RTL	RTL Lëtzebuerg	All shows	Luxembourgish: Roger Saurfeld and Raoul Roos	
Luxembourg	RTL	RTL Today	SF2/Final	English: Melissa Dalton and Meredith Moss	
Luxembourg	RTL	RTL Infos	SF2/Final	French: Fabien Rodrigues and Jérôme Didelot	
Malta	PBS	TVM	All shows	No commentary	
Montenegro	RTCG	TVCG 1, TVCG MNE	All shows	Dražen Bauković	
Netherlands	AVROTROS	NPO 1, BVN	All shows	Cornald Maas	
Netherlands	AVROTROS	NPO Radio 2	Final	Carolien Borgers	
Norway	NRK	NRK1	All shows	Marte Stokstad	
Norway	NRK	NRK P1	Final	Jon Marius Hyttebakk	
Poland	TVP	TVP1, TVP Polonia	All shows	Artur Orzech	
Portugal	RTP	RTP1, RTP Internacional	All shows (Note: The broadcast of the second semi-final will start delayed, at 22:00 (WEST) on RTP Internacional and RTP Internacional Ásia, and at 22:30 (WEST) on RTP1 and RTP Internacional América)	José Carlos Malato and Nuno Galopim	
San Marino	SMRTV	San Marino RTV	All shows	Anna Gaspari and Gigi Restivo	
Serbia	RTS	RTS 1, RTS Svet	All shows	Duška Vučinić	
Serbia	RTS	Radio Belgrade 1	SF2, Final	Nikoleta Dojčinović and Katarina Tošić	
Slovenia	RTVSLO	TV SLO 2	Semi-finals	Mojca Mavec	
Slovenia	RTVSLO	TV SLO 1	Final	Mojca Mavec	
Slovenia	RTVSLO	Radio Val 202	SF1	Maj Valerij	
Slovenia	RTVSLO	Radio Val 202	Final	Maj Valerij and Igor Bračič	
Spain	RTVE	La 2	SF2	Spanish: Julia Varela and Tony Aguilar	
Spain	RTVE	La 1	SF1	Spanish: Julia Varela and Tony Aguilar	
Spain	RTVE	La 1	Final	Spanish: Julia Varela and Tony Aguilar; Catalan: (Note: Catalan-language commentary option available only in Catalonia.) Sònia Urbano and Xavi Martínez	
Spain	RTVE	TVE Internacional	All shows	Spanish: Julia Varela and Tony Aguilar	
Spain	RTVE	Radio Nacional, Radio Exterior, RNE para todos	Final	Spanish: David Asensio, Sara Calvo, and Luis Miguel Montes	
Spain	RTVE	Ràdio 4	Final	Catalan: Sònia Urbano and Xavi Martínez	
Sweden	SVT	SVT1	Semi-finals	Edward af Sillén	
Sweden	SVT	SVT1	Final	Edward af Sillén and Petra Mede	
Sweden	SVT	SVT Play (Note: Including Swedish-language commentary option from SVT1 for all shows)	Final	Northern Sámi: Aslak Paltto and Inari Sámi: Heli Huovinen (Note: In simulcast of broadcast from Finland's Yle Areena)	
Sweden	SR	Sveriges Radio P4	All shows	Carolina Norén	
Switzerland	SRG SSR	RSI La 1	All shows	Italian: Ellis Cavallini and Gian-Andrea Costa	
Switzerland	SRG SSR	RTS 1	Semi-finals	French: Jean-Marc Richard and Nicolas Tanner	
Switzerland	SRG SSR	RTS 1	Final	French: Jean-Marc Richard, Nicolas Tanner and Victoria Turrian	
Switzerland	SRG SSR	SRF 1	All shows	German: Sven Epiney	
Switzerland	SRG SSR	SRF info	All shows	Swiss-German Sign Language interpretation	
Switzerland	SRG SSR	Play SRF	Final	German: Patti Basler	
Switzerland	SRG SSR	Play RTS	All shows	Swiss-French Sign Language interpretation	
Switzerland	SRG SSR	Radio SRF 3	Final	German: Céline Werdelis	
Switzerland	SRG SSR	RTS Première	Final	French: Claire Mudry	
Switzerland	SRG SSR	RSI Rete Tre	Final	Italian: Davide Gagliardi	
Switzerland	SRG SSR	Radio RTR	Final	Romansh: Elias Tsoutsaios	
Ukraine	Suspilne	Suspilne Kultura	SF1	Timur Miroshnychenko and Olexandr Pedan	
Ukraine	Suspilne	Suspilne Kultura	SF2	Timur Miroshnychenko and Vlad Kuran	
Ukraine	Suspilne	Suspilne Kultura	Final	Timur Miroshnychenko and Alyona Alyona	
Ukraine	Suspilne	Suspilne Kultura	All shows	Ukrainian Sign Language: Tetiana Zhurkova, Anfisa Boldusieva, Oleksandr Rudyk and Lada Sokoliuk	
Ukraine	Suspilne	Radio Promin	Semi-finals	Dmytro Zakharchenko and Lesia Antypenko	
Ukraine	Suspilne	Radio Promin	Final	Anna Zakletska and Denys Denysenko	
United Kingdom	BBC	BBC One	Semi-finals	Scott Mills and Rylan	
United Kingdom	BBC	BBC One	Final	Graham Norton	
United Kingdom	BBC	BBC Red Button	All shows	British Sign Language interpretation	
United Kingdom	BBC	BBC Radio 2	Semi-finals	Sara Cox and Richie Anderson	
United Kingdom	BBC	BBC Radio 2	Final	Scott Mills and Rylan	

Broadcasters and commentators in non-participating countries and territories
Country	Broadcaster	Channel(s)	Show(s)	Commentator(s)	Ref.
Chile	Zapping	Zapping Channel	All shows	No commentary	
Faroe Islands	KVF	KVF 1	All shows	Gunnar Nolsøe	
Kosovo	RTK	RTK 1	All shows	Agron Krasniqi and Egzona Rafuna	
Moldova	TRM	Moldova 1	All shows	Ion Jalbă and Daniela Crudu	
North Macedonia	MRT	MRT 1, Radio Skopje	All shows	Aleksandra Jovanovska	
United States	NBC	Peacock	All shows	No commentary	

== Other awards ==
=== Marcel Bezençon Awards ===
The Marcel Bezençon Awards honour songs in the contest's final. They have been organised since 2002 by Sweden's then-head of delegation and 1992 representative Christer Björkman and 1984 winner Richard Herrey. The awards are divided into three categories: the Artistic Award, the Composers Award, and the Media Award. The winners were revealed shortly before the Eurovision final on 17 May.

Category	Country	Song	Artist	Songwriter(s)
Composers Award	Switzerland	"Voyage"	Zoë Më	Emily Middlemas; Tom Oehler; Zoë Anina Kressler
Artistic Award	France	"Maman"	Louane	Anne Edwige Maria Peichert; Tristan Salvati
Media Award	France	"Maman"	Louane	Anne Edwige Maria Peichert; Tristan Salvati

=== OGAE ===
OGAE, an organisation of over forty Eurovision Song Contest fan clubs across Europe and beyond, conducts an annual voting poll first held in 2002 as the Marcel Bezençon Fan Award. After all votes were cast, the top-ranked entry in the 2025 poll was Sweden's "Bara bada bastu" performed by KAJ; the top five results are shown below.

Country	Song	Artist	Points
Sweden	"Bara bada bastu"	KAJ	421
Austria	"Wasted Love"	JJ	382
Netherlands	"C'est la vie"	Claude	278
Finland	"Ich komme"	Erika Vikman	253
Malta	"Serving"	Miriana Conte	164

The You're a Vision Award, which had been awarded by Songfestival.be since 2022 following the discontinuation of the Barbara Dex Award, was not organised in the months following the contest; no announcements have been made since regarding its status. This was the first time since 1996 that no award was given out based on the outfits worn by the competing artists during the live shows.

== Reception ==
=== Commercial impact ===
Following the 2025 contest, four entries entered the Billboard Global 200 chart dated 31 May 2025: Germany's "Baller" at number 80, Estonia's "Espresso Macchiato" at number 93, Sweden's "Bara bada bastu" at number 123, and Austria's winning entry "Wasted Love" at number 167. On the Billboard Global Excl. US chart also dated 31 May 2025, the four aforementioned entries entered at numbers 28, 33, 45, and 63, respectively, followed by Norway's "Lighter" at number 172. Additionally, the "Made in Switzerland" interval act from the first semi-final was released as a single on 6 June 2025, and peaked at number 16 on the Swiss Hitparade.

=== Controversies on Israeli participation ===
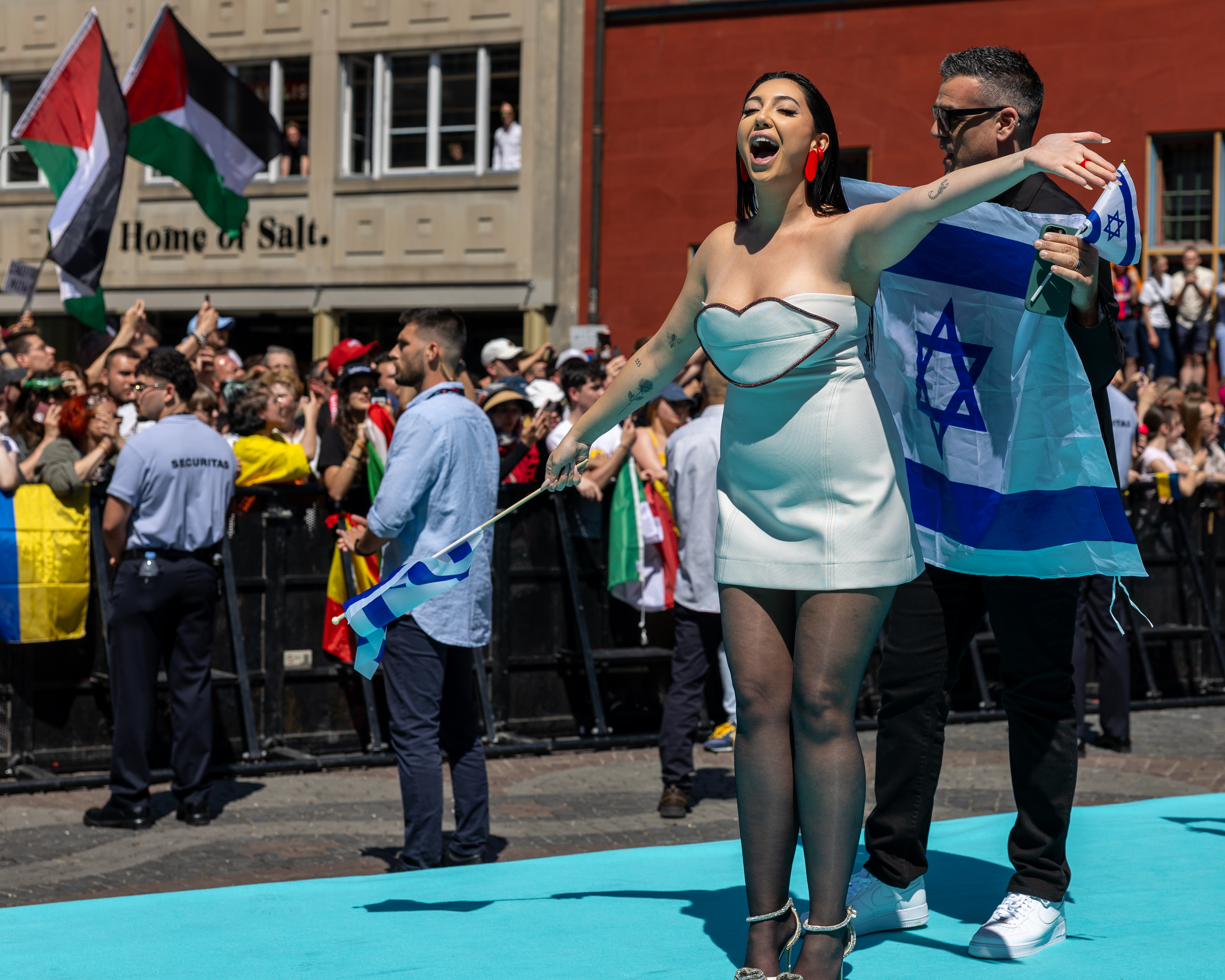
The Israeli entrant Yuval Raphael on the "Turquoise Carpet" in Basel with pro-Palestinian demonstrations in the background, 11 May 2025

Due to the continuing Gaza war, Israel's participation in the contest remained controversial, with calls for the exclusion of the country from the event. The Slovenian broadcaster RTVSLO submitted a demand for the EBU to exclude Israel, while Spanish broadcaster RTVE, Irish broadcaster RTÉ, Icelandic broadcaster RÚV, and Belgian broadcaster VRT called for a wider discussion among EBU members regarding Israel's participation. The EBU committed to a discussion regarding Israel's involvement "in due course", but reiterated that it is "an association of public service broadcasters, not governments", and that all EBU members are eligible to compete. 72 former Eurovision contestants signed a letter calling for Israel's exclusion, including former winners Charlie McGettigan and Salvador Sobral; the previous edition's winner Nemo and this edition's winner JJ later publicly joined calls to exclude Israel.

During the introductory postcard preceding Israel's performance in the second semi-final, RTVE's commentators Tony Aguilar and Julia Varela mentioned the number of Palestinian casualties of the war. Following a complaint filed by the Israeli broadcaster Kan, the EBU warned RTVE it would be fined if its commentators "mention the Gaza conflict again". Ahead of the final, RTVE aired a message that read "When human rights are at stake, silence is not an option. Peace and justice for Palestine". During the final, Israel's performance was met with booing by the audience; the Swiss host broadcaster SRG SSR replaced this in the television broadcast with pre-recorded applause.

Israel ultimately won the televote and finished in second place overall, prompting a number of participating broadcasters, including RTVE, VRT, RÚV, Belgium's French-speaking RTBF, Finland's Yle, Norway's NRK, RTÉ, and the Netherlands' AVROTROS and NPO, to call for a rework of the televoting system while also highlighting concerns over Israel's participation. RTVE, VRT, and RTÉ additionally called for an independent audit of their countries' televoting results; the Spanish and Belgian televote awarded 12 points to Israel, while the Irish televote awarded 10. Eurovision News Spotlight, a fact-checking and open-source intelligence initiative by the EBU, published an investigation on 19 May 2025 which found evidence that the Israel Government Advertising Agency had conducted a cross-platform advertising campaign and utilised official state social media accounts to encourage public support for Israel's entry in the contest, specifically providing instructions on how voters could cast all 20 of their allowed votes for Israel. The advertisements received over 68 million total impressions. The Israeli government had previously admitted to deploying the same strategy during the 2024 contest. The EBU stated that the voting process had been independently verified, and that there was no evidence that allowing viewers to vote up to 20 times had disproportionately impacted the results.

== Official album ==
Cover art of the official album

Eurovision Song Contest: Basel 2025 is the official compilation album of the contest, featuring all 37 entries. It was put together by the European Broadcasting Union and released by Universal Music Group digitally on 18 April 2025, in CD format on 25 April 2025, and in vinyl format on 23 May 2025.

=== Charts ===
==== Weekly charts ====
Weekly chart performance for Eurovision Song Contest: Basel 2025
Chart (2025)	Peak position
Australian Albums (ARIA)	37
Belgian Compilation Albums (Ultratop 50 Flanders)	1
Belgian Compilation Albums (Ultratop 50 Wallonia)	1
Danish Compilation Albums (Tracklisten)	5
Dutch Compilation Albums (Compilation Top 30)	1
German Compilation Albums (Offizielle Top 100)	1
Greek Albums (IFPI)	6
Irish Compilation Albums (IRMA)	1
Norwegian Physical Albums (IFPI Norge)	5
Polish Physical Albums (ZPAV)	20
Swedish Physical Albums (Sverigetopplistan)	4
UK Compilation Albums (Official Charts)	1
US Top Compilation Albums (Billboard)	9

==== Year-end charts ====
Year-end chart performance for Eurovision Song Contest: Basel 2025
Chart (2025)	Peak position
Belgian Compilation Albums (Ultratop 50 Flanders)	4
Belgian Compilation Albums (Ultratop 50 Wallonia)	5
Dutch Compilation Albums (Compilation Top 30)	5
German Compilation Albums (Offizielle Top 100)	9

== See also ==
- Junior Eurovision Song Contest 2025
