= 2024 Basel-Stadt Eurovision expenditure referendum =

Cantonal referendum in Switzerland

- 24 November 2024
- Grand Council resolution on the authorisation of expenditure for the staging of the Eurovision Song Contest (ESC) 2025 in Basel

Results
Choice	Votes	%
Yes	38,186	66.57%
No	19,172	33.43%
Valid votes	57,358	96.59%
Invalid or blank votes	2,027	3.41%
Total votes	59,385	100.00%
Registered voters/turnout	103,919	57.15%
- Results by municipality For: 50-55% 55-60% 60–65% 65–70% 70–75% 75-80% >80% Against: 50-55% 55-60% 60–65% 65–70% 70–75% 75-80% >80%

A referendum on the approval of expenditure for the Eurovision Song Contest 2025 was held in the Basel-Stadt canton in Switzerland on 24 November 2024. In August of that year, Basel was announced as the host city of Eurovision 2025, with the Grand Council of Basel-Stadt approving a CHF 37.4 million (Note: With CHF 2.5 million of direct revenue from the arena taken into account, the costs were projected to total CHF 34.964 million) expenditure in September. The Federal Democratic Union party successfully launched a signature drive to hold a referendum on the funding. Basel-Stadt voters approved the referendum, with 66.57% eventually voting in favour of granting the expenditure.

== Background ==
The Eurovision Song Contest 2024 was won by Swiss singer Nemo with their song "The Code". On 30 August 2024, the European Broadcasting Union selected Basel as the host city for the Eurovision Song Contest 2025, with the event to be held at St. Jakobshalle. Simultaneously, the government of Basel-Stadt canton announced it would submit the funding proposal to the Grand Council of Basel-Stadt for approval.

The Federal Democratic Union (EDU) had promised to launch referendums to potentially block funding proposals in any city that agreed to host the song contest prior to the August announcement. The Grand Council approved the funding proposal, which would set aside CHF 37.464 million for Eurovision, on 11 September. The vote was approved with 87 in favour and 4 against, with 4 abstentions. Signature collection for the referendum began on 14 September, with 2,000 certified signatures being required by 26 October. 4,203 signatures were submitted by the 26 October deadline.

The EDU opposed Basel organising the Eurovision Song Contest due to its belief that Eurovision was a "propaganda event", with EDU legislator Samuel Kullmann stating that the 2024 contest was a "celebration of evil". Particular attention was noted to that year's Irish representative Bambie Thug, with Kullman arguing Bambie Thug's performance was "overtly occult to a very, very high degree", and protests around Israel's participation in the event due to the Gaza war, which EDU officials labelled antisemitic. Imagery of Bambie Thug was featured prominently in the EDU's campaign.

While the EDU is generally considered a minor political party, some factions of the larger Swiss People's Party (SVP) offered their support to the EDU's efforts. Marcel Dettling, president of the SVP, argued that the money appropriated for Eurovision would "be better donated to those seriously affected by the storms than wasted on this embarrassing rainbow event", following extreme weather events in the summer of 2024.

Within the canton of Basel-Stadt, the EDU was noted to have a minute level of support, with The New York Times reporting that fewer than 300 voters in Basel city supported the party at the 2023 Swiss federal election. Members of the EDU travelled from outside the canton in order to solicit the required signatures.

Edi Estermann, a spokesperson for the Swiss Broadcasting Corporation, stated that the referendum introduced "a certain amount of planning uncertainty", and that if it were to succeed in blocking funding, funding for the Eurovision Song Contest "would have to be greatly reduced".

The Executive Council and Grand Council both advised a Yes vote on the referendum.

== Results ==
With a 57% turnout, 66.6% of voters supported the proposal, allowing the funding to be spent on financing the Eurovision Song Contest 2025.

2024 Basel-Stadt Eurovision expenditure referendum
Choice	Votes	%
For	38,186	66.57
Against	19,172	33.43
Total	57,358	100.00
Valid votes	57,358	96.59
Invalid/blank votes	2,027	3.41
Total votes	59,385	100.00
Registered voters/turnout	103,919	57.15
Source: Canton of Basel-Stadt

=== By municipality ===
All three municipalities voted in favour.

Canton	For	%	Against	%	Total	Turnout
Basel	32,977	67.49	15,884	32.51	50,682	56.26
Riehen	4,925	61.52	3,080	38.48	8,200	62.82
Bettingen	284	57.72	208	42.28	503	64.40
Source: Canton of Basel-Stadt (archive link)
