= Ylfete Fanaj =

Swiss politician (born 1982)

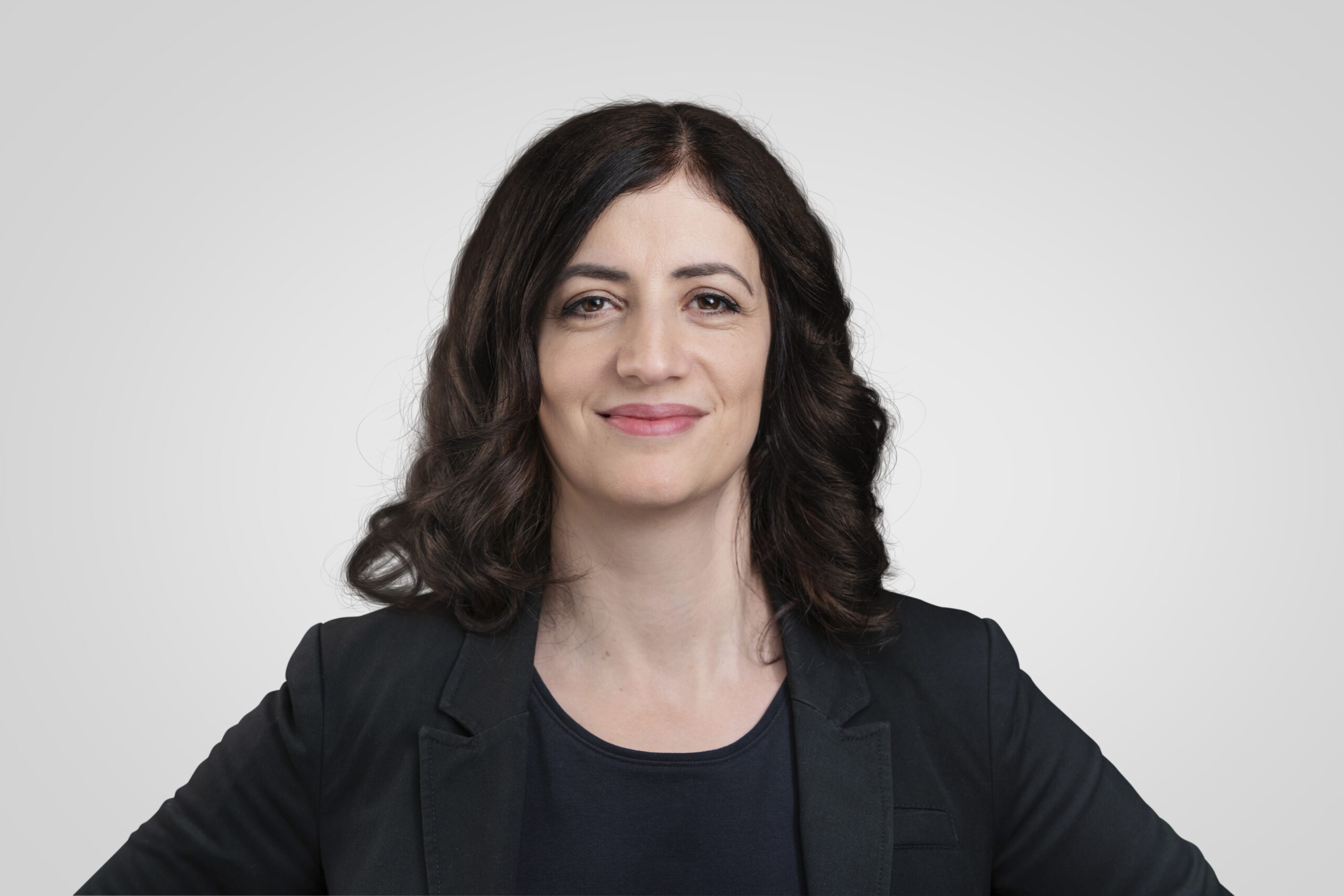
- Official portrait, 2023

Member of the Executive Council of Lucerne
- Incumbent
- Assumed office 14 May 2023

Member of the Cantonal Council of Lucerne
- In office 20 June 2011 – 19 June 2023

Personal details
- Born: Ylfete Fanaj; 11 July 1982 (age 44) Prizren, FPR Yugoslavia (now Prizren, Kosovo)
- Citizenship: Switzerland; Kosovo
- Party: Social Democratic Party
- Children: 1
- Website: Official website Parliament website

Ylfete Fanaj (German pronunciation: [ˈɪlfɛtə ˈfanaɪ]; Albanian pronunciation: [ylˈfɛtɛ ˈfa.naɪ]; born 11 July 1982) is a Kosovo-born Swiss Albanian politician who currently serves as member of the Executive Council of the Canton of Lucerne since being elected in 2023. In this function, she also serves as the Head of the canton's Justice and Security Department. She previously served as member of the Cantonal Council of Lucerne from 2011 to 2023. In the legislative period 2020/2021 she has been president of the council. She was the first female Swiss Albanian minister in Switzerland.

Fanaj is a member and supporter of multiple regional organizations, including Lucerne's Association for the Protection of Abused Women, Central Switzerland's Consultancy for Undocumented Migrants, the Lucerne Association for the Interests of Sex Workers and the Association of Public Workers.
