= Executive Council of Basel-Stadt =

The Executive Council (German: Regierungsrat) is the executive body of the Swiss canton of Basel-Stadt. The seven-member collegial body is elected by the people for a period of four years. The last election was held in October/November 2024. The people directly elect the president. The president of the Executive Council also serves as mayor for the city of Basel.

== Current composition ==
As of 2024, the Executive Council was composed as follows:

Name	Party	Department
Conradin Cramer	LDP	Head of the Presidential department and mayor of Basel
Tanja Soland	SP	Department of Finance
Kaspar Sutter	SP	Department of Social Services, Economy and the Environment
Esther Keller	GLP	Department of Construction and Transport
Stephanie Eymann	LDP	Department of Health
Mustafa Atici	SP	Department of Justice and Home Affairs
Lukas Engelberger	The Centre	Department of Education

== 2024 Executive Council elections ==
=== Results ===
In the first round of voting on 20 October 2024, the following six candidates were elected directly:

Name	Party	Votes	Notes
Conradin Cramer	LDP	28,032	Incumbent
Tanja Soland	SP	34,165	Incumbent
Kaspar Sutter	SP	29,395	Incumbent
Lukas Engelberger	CVP	27,872	Incumbent
Mustafa Atici	SP	27,517	Incumbent
Stephanie Eymann	SP	26,471	Incumbent

In the second round of voting (German: Stichwahl) on 24 November 2024, the following candidate was elected for the seventh and final position:

Name	Party	Votes	Notes
Esther Keller	GLP	30,722	Incumbent

=== Campaign ===
The campaign was marked by a significant voter turnout of 44.79% and an increase in campaign spending by the major parties compared to previous years:

Party		CHF 2024
Swiss Liberal Party	LDP	165,000
Swiss Socialist Party	SP	160,000
Green Liberal Party	GLP	120,000
Green Party	GPS	35,000
