= Mustafa Atici =

Swiss politician of Kurdish descent

- Mustafa Atıcı
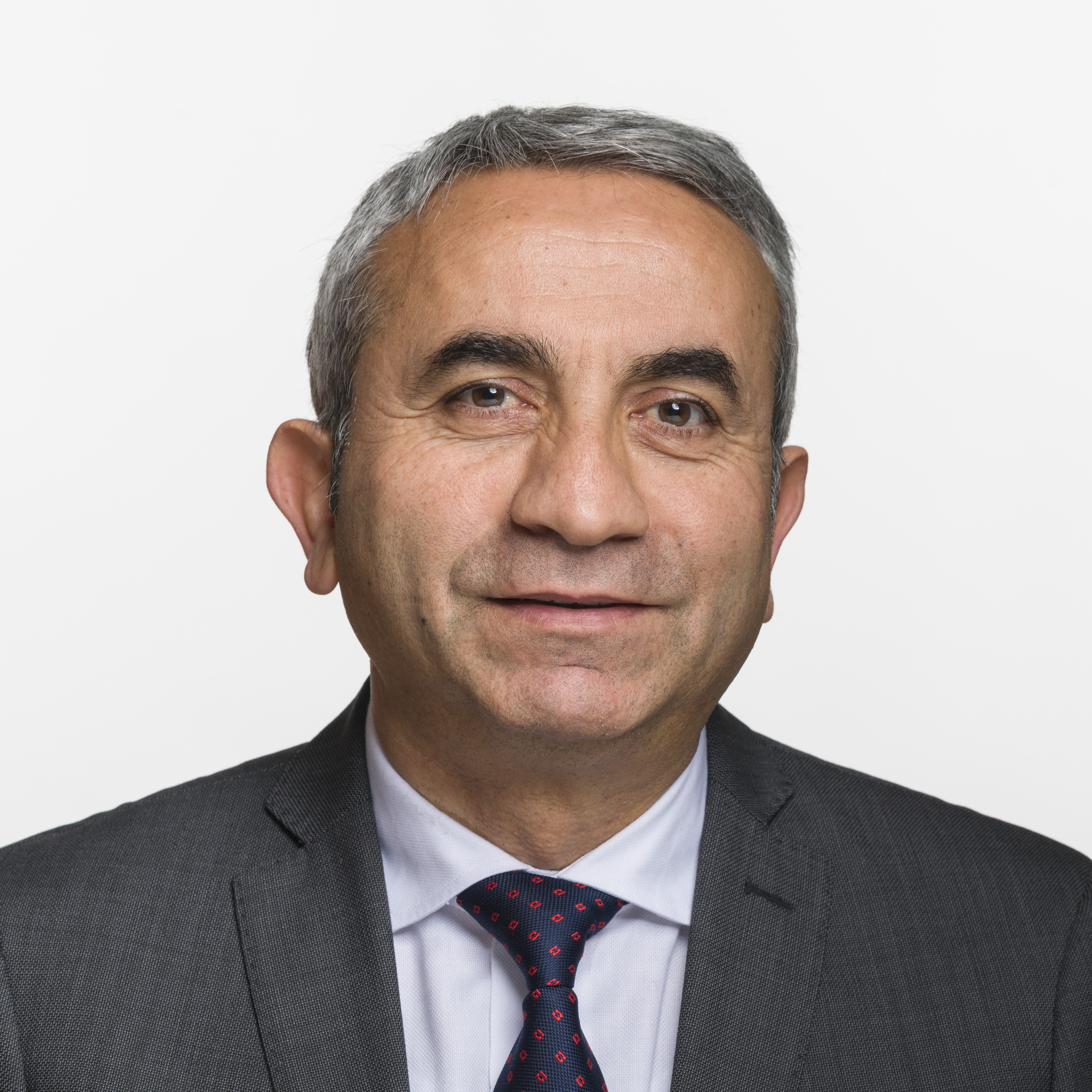
- Official portrait, 2023

Member of the Executive Council of Basel-Stadt
- Incumbent
- Assumed office 1 May 2024

Member of the National Council (Switzerland)
- In office 2 December 2019 – 3 December 2023

Personal details
- Born: Mustafa Atıcı; 2 October 1969 (age 56) Elbistan, Turkey
- Citizenship: Switzerland; Turkey
- Party: Social Democratic Party
- Spouse: Cennet Yildiz
- Children: 2
- Education: Pertevniyal High School
- Alma mater: Gazi University; University of Basel

Mustafa Atici (Turkish pronunciation: [musˈtafa ˈatɯtʃɯ]; born 2 October 1969) is a Turkish-born Swiss businessman and politician who currently serves as member of the Executive Council of Basel-Stadt since 2024 for the Social Democratic Party. He previously served on the National Council (Switzerland) from 2019 to 2023 and on the Grand Council of Basel-Stadt from 2005 to 2019.

== Early life and education ==
Atici was born 2 October 1969 in Elbistan, Turkey, the fourth of eight children, of grain traders of Kurdish descent. His father was a grain wholesaler who traded the grain of small village producers in Eastern Anatolia in Istanbul. The family was considered upper middle class living on the second floor of a commercial building and sheep, cows and goats on the first floor.

He completed primary school in Elbistan, some high school in Gaziantep before entering Pertevniyal High School in Istanbul in 1982. Between 1987 and 1989, he began studying industrial engineering at Gazi University in Ankara.

After a brief stay with relatives in Cologne, Germany, he came to Basel in 1991 visiting relatives and decided to study economics at the University of Basel. He received a Master's degree at the European Institute of the University of Basel in 1998. Initially he wanted to go back to Turkey to become a full professor.

== Professional career ==
During a visit to his sister in London he became familiarized with the business model of doner kebab shops and decided to launch in Basel. He was a pioneer of the industry opening the first shop ("City-Liner") in 1996. He sold this venture in 2002. Since 2000, Atici operates the restaurants of St. Jakob-Park, claiming his business runs that well because he was the inventor of the cocktail sauce with döner combination.

== Political career ==
Since having arrived in Switzerland he was impressed by the federal administration and multilingualism of Switzerland and soon decided that he wanted to get involved in Swiss politics. He applied to become a citizen the day he was allowed to do so. Being raised in a family with a social democratic background, he joined the SP.

As a representative of the SP, he was elected into the Grand Council of Basel-Stadt in 2005 and served as a member of the Grand Council until May 2019. In the Grand Council he advocated for a better framework for the Small and medium-sized enterprises (SMBs) and also the improvement of the education. He took part in a delegation of Swiss politicians around Balthasar Glättli to Diyarbakir and Van, serving as a translator in their interviews with imprisoned politicians like Hatip Dicle and Selma Irmak. After Turkey bombed the mainly Kurdish population in Afrin, Syria, and subsequently invaded and captured Afrin, he was a leading force behind a resolution of the Grand Council which condemned the Turkish invasion of Afrin.

In the parliamentary elections in 2019 he was placed third in the Canton Basel-Stadt and until October 2023 he represented the Canton of Basel-Stadt in the Federal Assembly of Switzerland. In view of the earthquake in Syria and Turkey, he voiced support for an accelerated visa program for victims with relatives in Switzerland.

In May 2024, Atici was elected to serve as member of the Executive Council of Basel-Stadt.

== Personal life ==
Atici is married and has two children. In 1990s six of his siblings lived in Switzerland. He is also a member of the Alevi cultural centre of Basel. He is a Swiss and Turkish dual citizen.
