= Angela Koller =

Swiss politician

Angela Koller (born 24 August 1983) is a Swiss politician representing The Centre in Appenzell Innerrhoden. She was elected as a Landammann for the canton in 2025, becoming the first female Landammann in Appenzell Innerrhoden.

== Biography ==
Angela Koller is a lawyer and member of The Centre. She currently serves on the Grand Council of Appenzell Innerrhoden. Per the Appenzell Employees' Association, which Koller is a member of, she was born on 24 August 1983. In April 2025, Koller was elected as Landammann of Appenzell Innerrhoden. Her position was decided through the Landsgemeinde, a public forum that Appenzell Innerrhoden uses to elect its cantonal leaders and judges. Koller was decided as the standing Landammann, with Roland Dähler as the governing Landammann. Koller will become the governing Landammann in 2027. Koller was the first woman elected as Landammann in Appenzell Innerrhoden. Appenzell Innerrhoden was the last Swiss canton where women's suffrage was legalised, with women first voting in 1991.
