= Conradin Cramer =

Swiss politician

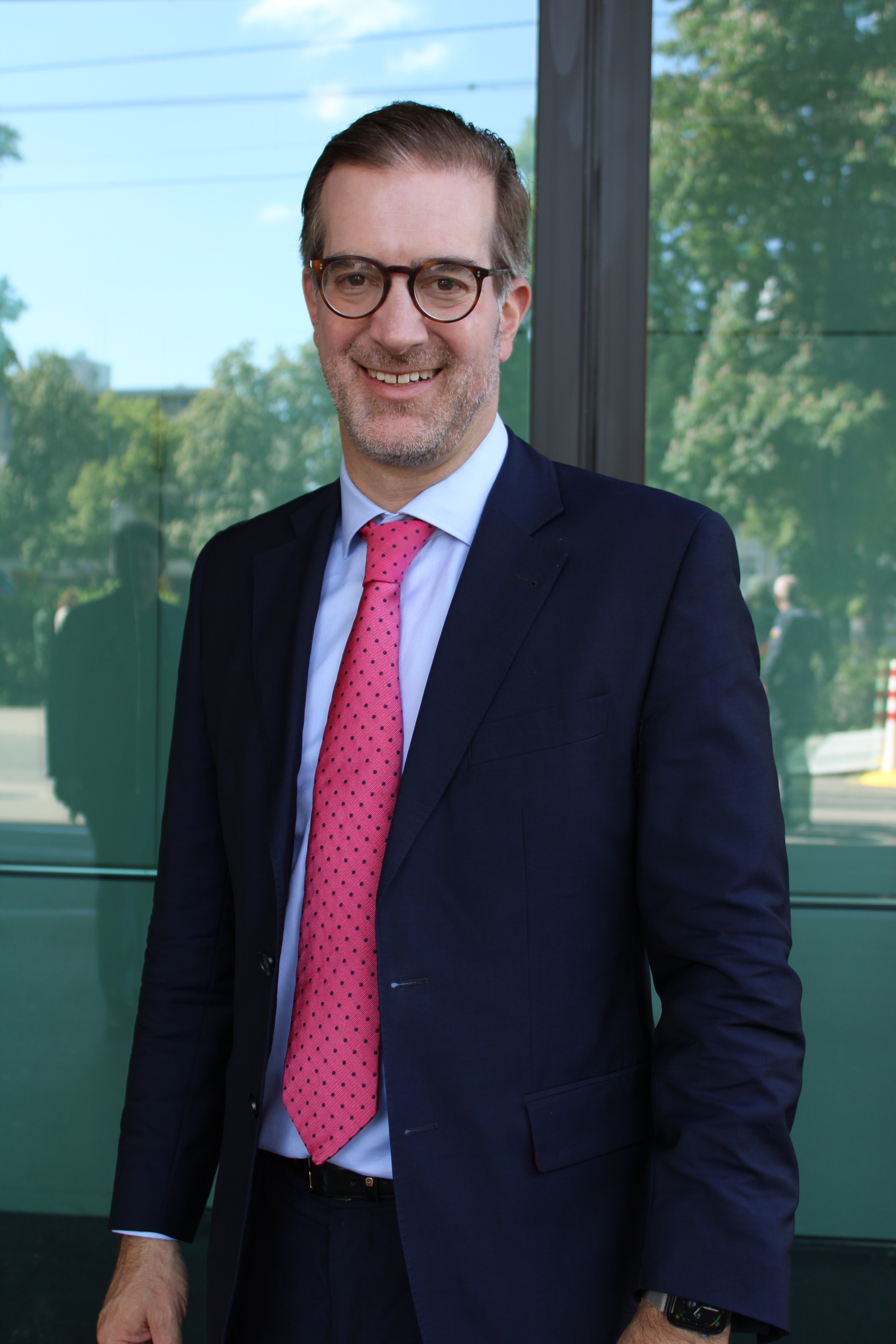
Conradin Cramer in 2025

Conradin Cramer (born 17 February 1979 in Basel) is a Swiss politician (Liberal Democratic Party LDP). He has been a member of the cantonal government of Basel-Stadt since 8 February 2017.

== Personal life ==
Cramer attended the Bäumlihof Gymnasium, which he completed with the Swiss Matura. He studied law at the University of Basel and the Albert-Ludwigs-University in Freiburg im Breisgau and received his doctorate with the dissertation Der Bonus im Arbeitsvertrag, for which he was awarded the Prize of the Faculty of Law of the University of Basel in 2007. In 2011 he obtained a Master of Laws (LL.M.) degree from the University of California, Berkeley. From 2013 until 2019 he had held a teaching position for private law at the University of Basel. In December 2017, he completed his habilitation and was awarded the venia docendi for private law and the title of a private lecturer by the University of Basel.

From 2007 until he took office as a member of the government council, he worked full-time as a lawyer and since 2009 also as a notary in the law firm Vischer in Basel.

Cramer is a former member of the students' fraternity Zofingia and board member of E.E. Zunft zum Schlüssel.

He is married, father of two daughters and lives with his family in Riehen, Switzerland.

== Politics ==
From 2002 to 2007 Cramer was a member of the council of the municipality of Riehen. From 2005 to 2017 he was a member of the Grand Council of the Canton of Basel-Stadt. From 1999 to 2005, he was President of the Young Liberal Party of Basel. From 2009 to 2014, he was a member of the Grand Council's Executive Committee, the so-called Office of the Grand Council. On 6 February 2013, Cramer was elected President of the Grand Council for the 2013/2014 term by 90 votes out of 98, making him the youngest President of the Grand Council in 100 years. From 2014 to February 2017, he chaired the Commission for land-use planning.

Conradin Cramer ran for National Council in October 2015. He reached second place on the list and is thus the first successor to the elected MP Christoph Eymann. On 8 March 2016, the Liberal Democratic Party of Basel nominated Cramer as its candidate for the 2016 government elections. On 23 October 2016, he was elected to the government council in the first round of voting. On 8 February 2017, Cramer took office as Minister for Education of the Canton of Basel-Stadt.

== Publications ==
- Der Bonus im Arbeitsvertrag. Stämpfli Verlag, Bern 2007, ISBN 978-3-7272-0697-9
- In die Politik gehen. Tipps für den Nachwuchs. NZZ Libro, Zürich 2021, ISBN 978-3-907291-26-9
