= Marko Bošnjak (musician) =

Bosnian Croat singer (born 2004)

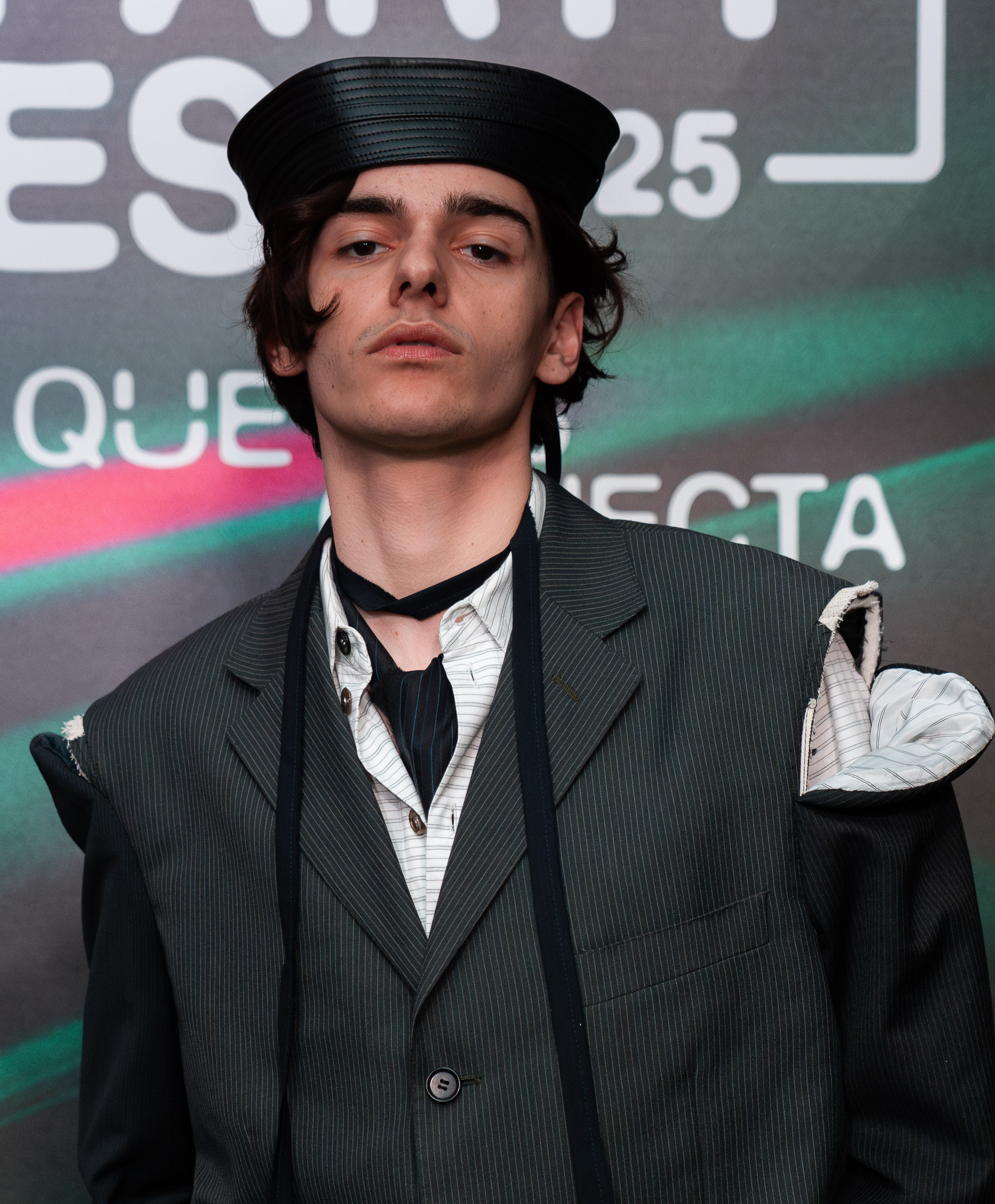
- Bošnjak in 2025

Background information
- Born: 11 January 2004 (age 22); Mostar, Bosnia and Herzegovina
- Genres: Pop
- Occupation: Singer
- Instruments: Vocals
- Years active: 2015–present
- Labels: Républika Music; Aquarius Records

Marko Bošnjak (pronounced [mâːrko bǒʃɲaːk]; born 11 January 2004) is a Bosnian Croat singer-songwriter. He rose to fame as the winner of the second season of the Serbian talent show Pinkove Zvezdice. He represented Croatia at the Eurovision Song Contest 2025 with the song "Poison Cake".

== Early life ==
Bošnjak was born in the Herzegovinian city of Mostar and grew up in the town of Prozor. Since the age of five, he sang in a church choir after his mother forced his older sisters to take him with them. Already at that age, he won the Djeca Pjevaju Isusu (Children Singing to Jesus) festival. At the age of 11, Bošnjak signed himself up for the Serbian talent show Pinkove Zvezdice (Pink's Little Stars), despite his father's objections due to the driving distance.

Bošnjak was a victim of school bullying in Prozor-Rama as he was "different" from other children of his age, which prompted him to change his environment and ultimately move to Zagreb, Croatia. Upon moving to Zagreb, he worked various jobs, such as nightclubs, customer support at LELO, and at KFC in Črnomerec. His confession about his KFC job in April 2023 went viral, as he had already risen to prominence up to that point. He quit KFC the following month to focus fully on music, although he did express his confusion to Story.hr: "All of that ['fuss'] surprised me, too, because I don't know since when it became embarrassing to work."

== Music career ==
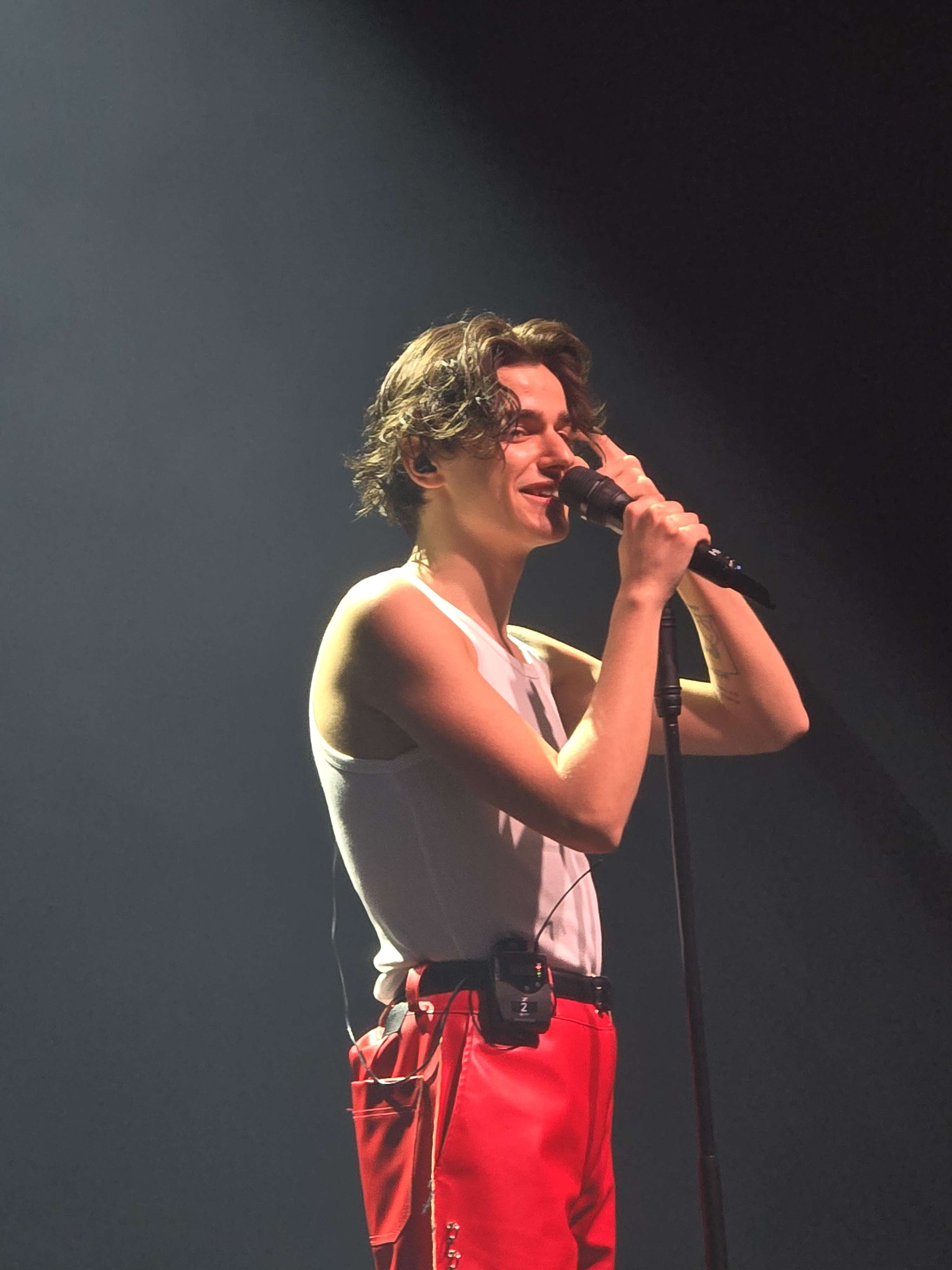
Bošnjak performing at the London Eurovision Party 2025

Starting on 4 September 2015, Bošnjak appeared as a contestant on the second season of Pinkove Zvezdice. On the first show, Bošnjak sang Jennifer Hudson's song "One Night Only". All five judges, Milan Stanković, Jelena Tomašević, Goca Tržan, Hari Varešanović and Leontina Vukomanović, turned their chairs up and voted him directly into the next round. At his second appearance he sang Zdravko Čolić's "Kao moja mati" (Like My Mother) and advanced into the next round. On 6 January 2016, Bošnjak sang a rendition of Jadranka Stojaković's "Što te nema" (Why Are You Not Here). During the next episode, on 8 April 2016, Bošnjak performed Adele's "Don't You Remember". In the final, Bošnjak re-sang "Što te nema" and won the competition.

On 17 December 2021, Bošnjak was announced as one of the fourteen participants in Dora 2022, the national contest for Croatia's Eurovision Song Contest 2022 entry, with the song "Moli za nas" (Pray For Us). At the close of voting, the song had received 179 points, placing second in a field of 14. "Moli za nas" was officially released on 10 February 2022 as Bošnjak's debut single. On 27 April 2022, it was announced that Bošnjak would compete in the 62nd edition of the Split Festival with the song "Pjesma za kraj" (Ending Song). A year later, in early 2023, Bošnjak released his third single "Spokojan" (Calm). On 14 April 2023, Bošnjak released his fourth stand-alone single "Nema" (There Is No).

In June 2024, Bošnjak performed at that year's Zagreb Pride. In September 2024, Bošnjak performed at a charity show for Gaza at Zagreb's Klub Močvara, the proceeds of which were donated to the UNRWA. In November 2024, he released his seventh single "Takav dan" (Such a Day), lyrically inspired by Zana's 1982 hit "Dodirni mi kolena" (Touch My Knees). The lyric "Tučem te ključem od stana" ("I'm beating you with the apartment key") sparked controversy and caused Bošnjak to be accused of promoting domestic violence; on HRT 1's show Kod nas doma, he told Iva Šulentić that the lyric recontextualizes one of Zana's lyrics and is "a hyperbole, an intertextuality... Like a small threat, but not too serious."

On 5 December 2024, Bošnjak was announced as one of 24 participants in Dora 2025, the Croatian national selection for the Eurovision Song Contest 2025, with the song "Poison Cake". On 24 February 2025, Bošnjak was announced to compete on the ninth season of the singing reality television series Tvoje lice zvuči poznato, the Croatian edition of Your Face Sounds Familiar. On 2 March 2025, Bošnjak won Dora, and was set to represent Croatia at the Eurovision Song Contest 2025 in Basel, Switzerland. Following his Dora victory, on 18 March, it was announced that Bošnjak would no longer participate in Tvoje lice zvuči poznato from the eighth episode onwards; at that point, only two episodes had been aired. Over the course of seven episodes, the last of which aired on 20 April 2025, he impersonated Mladen Grdović, Madonna, Zdravko Čolić, Miley Cyrus, Toše Proeski, Lady Gaga and Lepa Brena. On 13 May 2025, Bošnjak performed in the first semifinal of the Eurovision Song Contest 2025, where he earned 28 points, placing twelfth and failing to qualify for the grand final.

== Artistry and influences ==
At the age of 11, Bošnjak was initially releasing sevdalinka covers. He revealed in a March 2025 Gloria interview that his preferred musical styles range "from R&B and soul over hip-hop to classical music." Hesitant to name anybody as an influence on his music as he is "trying to be himself and create an authentic sound", he nevertheless named Lana Del Rey, Erykah Badu, SZA, Lola Young and Solange as artists he most frequently listens to, and acknowledged that his music "currently isn't inspired by them, but who knows, maybe it will be in the future." In the same interview, he stated that his biggest desire is to collaborate with Lorde. Bošnjak also expressed his admiration for Senidah, Josipa Lisac, Božo Vrećo and Filip Baloš.

For his fashion style, Bošnjak credited "fashion, but also musical icons such as David Bowie and Freddie Mercury, who proved to [him] that fashion can truly be as powerful a form of expression as music."

== Personal life ==
Bošnjak came out as gay in 2024, which attracted widespread homophobic backlash online following his Dora victory a year later. On 30 March 2025, Bošnjak was a guest on the talk show Nedjeljom u dva, where he discussed the backlash among other topics. The backlash continued following his failure to qualify to the final.

Since 2025, he has been in a relationship with his Spanish boyfriend.

In August 2025, he has announced that he will go on hiatus, as well as intention to withdraw from social media in order to focus on his mental health, after facing intense hate and criticism. He has additionally shared his struggles with feelings of worthlessness and suicidal thoughts. On 7 October 2025, he announced that he left Croatia.

== Discography ==
=== Singles ===
Title	Year	Peak chart positions	Album
Title	Year	CRO Dom.	Album
"Moli za nas"	2022	29	Non-album singles
"Pjesma za kraj"	2022	—	Non-album singles
"Spokojan"	2023	15	Non-album singles
"Nema"	2023	12	Non-album singles
"Pusti me"	2024	—	Non-album singles
"Asfalt" (with Iva Lorens)	2024	—	Non-album singles
"Takav dan"	2024	—	Non-album singles
"Zdravo budi mladi kralju"	2024	—	Non-album singles
"Poison Cake"	2025	1	Non-album singles
"Villain"	2025	—	Non-album singles
"—" denotes releases that did not chart or were not released in that territory.

== Awards and nominations ==
Year	Association	Category	Nominee / work	Result	Ref.
2023	Cesarica	Song of the Year	"Moli za nas"	Nominated	
2024	Cesarica	Song of the Year	"Spokojan"	Nominated	
2025	Eurovision Awards	Non-Qualifying Show-Stopper	Himself	Nominated	

== Notes ==
Awards and achievements
Preceded by Marija Serdar	Pinkove Zvezdice; Winner; 2016	Succeeded by Roko Blažević
Preceded by Baby Lasagna with "Rim Tim Tagi Dim"	Croatia in the Eurovision Song Contest; 2025	Succeeded by Lelek with "Andromeda"
