= Downunder: Live in Australia =

Live album by Bert Jansch
- Released: 22 January 2001
- Recorded: March 1998, over two nights at the Continental Café, Melbourne, Australia
- Genre: Folk
- Label: Castle Music
- Producer: Mixed at home by Bert Jansch

Bert Jansch chronology
Dazzling Stranger: The Bert Jansch Anthology (2000)	Downunder: Live in Australia (2001)	Edge of a Dream (2002)

Professional ratings
Review scores
Source	Rating
AllMusic	4/5 stars
The Encyclopedia of Popular Music	4/5 stars

Downunder: Live in Australia is a live album by Scottish folk musician Bert Jansch, released in January 2001. The concert was recorded over two nights at the Continental Café in Melbourne, Australia.

Bearing only a slight overlap with Jansch's previous live album Live at the 12 Bar in content, this was recorded on multi-track rather than straight-to-DAT, with consequently smoother sound and the rare bonus of accompanying musicians. The percussionist was added on after the gig recordings at a studio in Australia, and Jansch mixed the tracks in London.

== Track listing ==
All tracks composed by Bert Jansch; except where indicated

1. "Blues Run the Game" (Jackson C. Frank) - 3:08
2. "Come Back Baby" (Walter Davis) - 3:34
3. "The Lily of the West" (Traditional) - 4:14
4. "Paper Houses" - 3:09
5. "Toy Balloon" - 3:59
6. "My Donald" (Owen Hand) - 2:57
7. "Born and Bred in Old Ireland" - 3:04
8. "She Moved Through the Fair" (Traditional) - 5:22
9. "Carnival" (Jackson C. Frank) - 4:31
10. "Little Max" - 3:25
11. "Strolling Down the Highway" - 3:19
12. "Angie" (Nat Adderley, Davey Graham) - 3:50
13. "Curragh of Kildare" (Traditional) - 4:20
14. "Downunder" - 4:59
15. "How It All Came Down" - 4:13

== Personnel ==
- Bert Jansch - guitar, vocals
- Peter Howell - bass
- Ian Clarke - percussion
