= When the Circus Comes to Town =

Studio album by Bert Jansch
- Released: 28 August 1995
- Recorded: Bert Jansch's home & Boundary Row Studios, London
- Genre: Folk
- Label: Cooking Vinyl
- Producer: Bert Jansch, Jay Burnett

Bert Jansch chronology
The Ornament Tree (1990)	When the Circus Comes to Town (1995)	Live at the 12 Bar: An Authorised Bootleg (1996)

Professional ratings
Review scores
Source	Rating
AllMusic	4.5/5 stars
The Encyclopedia of Popular Music	5/5 stars

When the Circus Comes to Town is the 19th album by Scottish folk musician Bert Jansch, released in 1995. The song "Born and Bred in Old Ireland" was also recorded during these sessions but omitted from the UK album. Bert's manager intended to add it to a projected Japanese version of the album, which may or may not have happened. The track was re-recorded for Jansch's 1998 studio album, Toy Balloon.

== Track listing ==
All tracks composed by Bert Jansch; except where indicated

1. "Walk Quietly By"
2. "Open Road"
3. "Back Home"
4. "No-One Around" (Janie Romer)
5. "Step Back"
6. "When the Circus Comes to Town"
7. "Summer Heat"
8. "Just a Dream"
9. "The Lady Doctor from Ashington"
10. "Stealing the Night Away"
11. "Honey Don't You Understand"
12. "Born with the Blues"
13. "Morning Brings Peace of Mind"
14. "Living in the Shadows"

== Personnel ==
- Bert Jansch - guitar, vocals
- Colin Gibson - bass
- Liam Genockey - drums
- Mike Piggott - violin
- Mark Ramsden - soprano saxophone
- Bobby Barton - slide guitar
- Tony Hinnigan - strings
- Maggie Boyle, Janie Romer and Christine Collister - backing vocals
