= Andromeda (Lelek song) =

2026 single by Lelek

- Official cover art

Single by Lelek
- Language: Croatian
- Released: 9 January 2026
- Genre: Folk-pop
- Length: 2:59
- Composers: Filip Lacković; Lazar Pajić; Zorica Pajić
- Lyricist: Tomislav Roso
- Producers: Lacković; Roso

Lelek singles chronology
"Tane" (2025)	"Andromeda" (2026)	"Syenke" (2026)

Music videos
- "Andromeda" on YouTube "Andromeda" (choral version) on YouTube

Eurovision Song Contest 2026 entry
- Country: Croatia
- Composers: Filip Lacković; Lazar Pajić; Zorica Pajić
- Lyricist: Tomislav Roso

Finals performance
- Semi-final result: 6th
- Semi-final points: 175
- Final result: 15th
- Final points: 124

Entry chronology
- ◄ "Poison Cake" (2025)

Official performance video
- "Andromeda" (first semi-final) on YouTube "Andromeda" (grand final) on YouTube

"Andromeda" is a song by Croatian ethno-pop all-female band Lelek. A folk-pop power ballad track addressing the persecution of Catholic women in the Ottoman Empire, it was self-released as a single on 9 January 2026, and was composed by Serbian musician Zorja and her husband Lazar Pajić, alongside Filip Lacković, while the lyrics were written by Tomislav Roso. The song represented Croatia at the Eurovision Song Contest 2026, and finished in 15th place in the grand final with 124 points.

"Andromeda" received positive to mixed reviews from music critics. Many reviewers praised the song's traditional ethnic elements and atmospheric composition, while criticism was largely directed at its formulaic structure and inconsistent live vocal performances. The entry also received media attention after the broadcaster Kan issued an apology for a social media post that mocked the group's traditional sicanje facial markings.

The song peaked at number one on the Croatian Domestic Airplay chart and number 12 on the Billboard Croatia Songs chart, and entered the charts in Austria and Greece, as well as the Sweden Heatseeker and UK Singles Sales charts.

== Background and composition ==
"Andromeda" was written by Tomislav Roso, with music composed by Filip Lacković, Serbian singer-songwriter Zorica "Zorja" Pajić, and her husband, Lazar Pajić. Zorja also sang on the track's backing vocals. Zorja previously attempted to compete at Eurovision through Serbia's own national final, and her involvement was widely noted in Croatian and Serbian media because of her Serbian nationality.

The song was the second consecutive Dora entry from the Roso–Lacković pairing, who had previously written "The Soul of My Soul", with which Lelek placed fourth at Dora 2025. Lacković, a composer from Osijek whose music has since been used in marketing for the Game of Thrones franchise, had connected with Roso and the group's backing vocalist, Marin Novaković, after they discovered his music on YouTube, which led to their first collaboration on "The Soul of My Soul".

Lacković said that during the song's early development, when the song had neither finished lyrics nor a settled narrative, Roso began collaborating with Zorja by citing Hans Zimmer's score for Interstellar. He said he was given freedom over the early instrumental while Zorja and Pajić developed the vocal arrangement from the first demos and brought in elements of Zorja's own style, describing the writing process as one in which each collaborator's ideas shaped the finished song. Lacković added that he had known little about the historical subject before researching it for the track, and that once he grasped its weight, he wrote music that was "heavy and dark" to match it.

"Andromeda" has been described as a contemporary ethno-pop composition arranged as a folk-pop power ballad, sung in Croatian and running two minutes and 59 seconds. The arrangement is centred on Lelek's multi-part harmony singing, which moves from a restrained, melancholic verse into a more forceful, near-ritualistic chorus. Lacković, who has cited Bulgarian women's choral singing and orchestral film scoring among his influences, described the finished production as contemporary, with folk motifs used as texture within a modern pop arrangement rather than as period styling.

The lyrics concern the persecution of Catholic women from Bosnia and Herzegovina and parts of Dalmatia under Ottoman rule, and reference sicanje, a traditional form of tattooing worn by ethnic Croats in which crosses and other symbols were marked onto visible skin, worn as a sign of religious identity and, according to the group and Croatian ethnographic accounts, as protection against forced conversion, abduction, or enslavement. Group member Korina Olivia Rogić said the custom was more than a tattoo, describing it as a rite that grandmothers passed down to their children and grandchildren.

== Music video and promotion ==
The song was officially released as a single on 9 January 2026 ahead of Dora 2026. Following their win at Dora, the official music video premiered on 12 March 2026 through the Eurovision Song Contest's official YouTube channel. Directed by Jasmin Cvišić, the music video was filmed in a forest setting. It features the members of Lelek wearing white dresses adorned with handprints and facial markings that reference sicanje, which was featured in their national final performance.

To promote "Andromeda" before the Eurovision Song Contest 2026, Lelek participated in various Eurovision pre-parties. They participated at Eurovision in Concert 2026 which was held at AFAS Live Arena in Amsterdam on 11 April 2026. They also performed at the London Eurovision Party 2026 held at Here at Outernet on 19 April 2026. After the pre-parties, the group, together with Lavina and Tamara Živković, performed at the PZE Afterparty on 22 April 2026 which took place at Zappa Baza in Belgrade.

== Critical reception ==
=== Croatian media and personalities ===
2024 Croatian representative Baby Lasagna praised the song, calling it "confident and convincing". He also highlighted the effective use of ethnic elements, which he felt provided distinctiveness and authenticity. He described these attributes as a "huge advantage" for Eurovision, and expressed confidence that Lelek would stand out among the competition and voicing his support for their entry. Igor Vlajnić of Novi list expressed broad support for the song, praising its composition, concept, visual design, and performance quality. He remarked that the entry strongly reflected regional identity and tradition, providing ample opportunity to promote Croatia. However, he expressed doubts regarding its chances of winning Eurovision.

Reviewing for Večernji list, Ivan Tandarić and Ilija Jandrić offered mixed assessments of the entry. Tandarić found the song "a little pretentious" but acknowledged its potential to reach the Eurovision final, praising its memorable title, polyphonic structure, and use of traditional elements. He noted that the song's meaning would likely appeal to international audiences, though he advised that the act's visual presentation should be simplified. Conversely, Jandrić felt the song failed to leave a strong impression. Despite acknowledging Lelek's strong public support, he criticised the song as being "outdated", stating that it might have been better suited for the contest "thirty years ago".

=== Eurovision-related and international media ===
Glen Weldon of the National Public Radio ranked the entry eighth in his list of the 10 best songs competing at Eurovision 2026, calling it a "witchy ethno-bop" that is a "gorgeous, haunting affair" and "quite beautiful" melodically. In the Dutch newspaper de Volkskrant, Robert van Gijssel and Els de Grefte dubbed the song as one of the 10 best Eurovision songs of 2026, describing it as a "folk power ballad" featuring an "ominous atmosphere" that "almost give you goosebumps" and praising the group's "mythical-sounding" vocal harmonies. Although they noted the song's structure was "somewhat formulaic", they remarked that the conviction of the song delivery made it feel as though the listener was being "sung to directly from the 18th century".

Eva Frantz of Yle gave the song a rating of five out of 10, calling it "suggestive and enchanting", but noted that the singing must be flawless for the entry to be convincing, to which she acknowledged that "they are not always". Jon O'Brien from Vulture ranked the entry 17th out of the 35 entries, praising the group as a "formidable, imposing, and curiously bewitching presence" that offered a "satisfying" example of pagan folk. He wrote that the song redeemed Croatia's performance from last year, although he judged that it was "less impactful than "My Sister's Crown" by Vesna or as innovative as "Bur man laimi" by Tautumeitas".

In the Norwegian newspaper Dagbladet, Ralf Lofstad gave the song a three out of six, describing its performance as "very 'cinematic' bombastic" and likening the group to a gang of witches or high priestesses like Bene Gesserit from Dune, but declared that it is not a Eurovision winner. In TV 2, Line Haus also gave the entry a three out of six, calling the performance "captivating" and "impossible not to be drawn into Lelek's universe". However, she wrote that the group's biggest challenge is when they sing together, noting that one of the singers sang sourly and "ruined the overall impression".

== Eurovision Song Contest 2026 ==
=== Dora 2026 ===
Dora 2026 was the national final format organised by Croatian Radiotelevision (HRT) to select the Croatian representative for the Eurovision Song Contest 2026. The competition saw 24 entries competing across two semi-finals held between 12 and 13 February and a final on 15 February 2026. Each semi-final featured 12 competing entries from which eight advanced from each show to complete the 16-song lineup in the final. Results during the semi-finals were determined by votes from public televoting via telephone and SMS. Results during the final were determined by the 50/50 combination of votes from eight juries, which composed a split of four regional and four international juries, and public televoting. The juries assigned points from 1–8, 10, and 12 based on their ranking, while points from the televote are calculated based on a percentage of the total televoting points, calculated in proportion to the percentage of votes the song received out of the total number of votes cast, rounded to the nearest whole number.

Lelek was officially announced to compete in the national final on 3 December 2025. "Andromeda" was drawn to perform 12th in the first semi-final, and later qualified for the final, winning its semi-final with 9,586 votes. In the final, the song was drawn to perform 13th, ultimately winning the contest with 173 points, with a split score of 77 points from the juries and 96 points from televoting.

The costumes worn in the national final were designed by Croatian fashion designer Nicolas Diamane, and was described as being built around imperfection and texture, with deliberately irregular, "scarred" surfaces. It had black charred sections as representing a burned tree, and grey sections as representing ash, sacrifice, and loss. Plaited trim sewn onto the dresses was intended to represent an identity that remains connected under pressure, comparable to roots underground.The sleeve shapes were loosely modelled on traditional folk dress. The group also wore facial markings resembling sicanje.

=== At Eurovision ===
The Eurovision Song Contest 2026 took place at Wiener Stadthalle in Vienna, Austria, and consisted of two semi-finals held on the respective dates of 12 and 14 May and the final on 16 May 2026. During the allocation draw held on 12 January 2026, Croatia was drawn to compete in the first semi-final, performing in the first half of the show. Lelek was later drawn to perform third, after Sweden's Felicia and before Greece's Akylas.

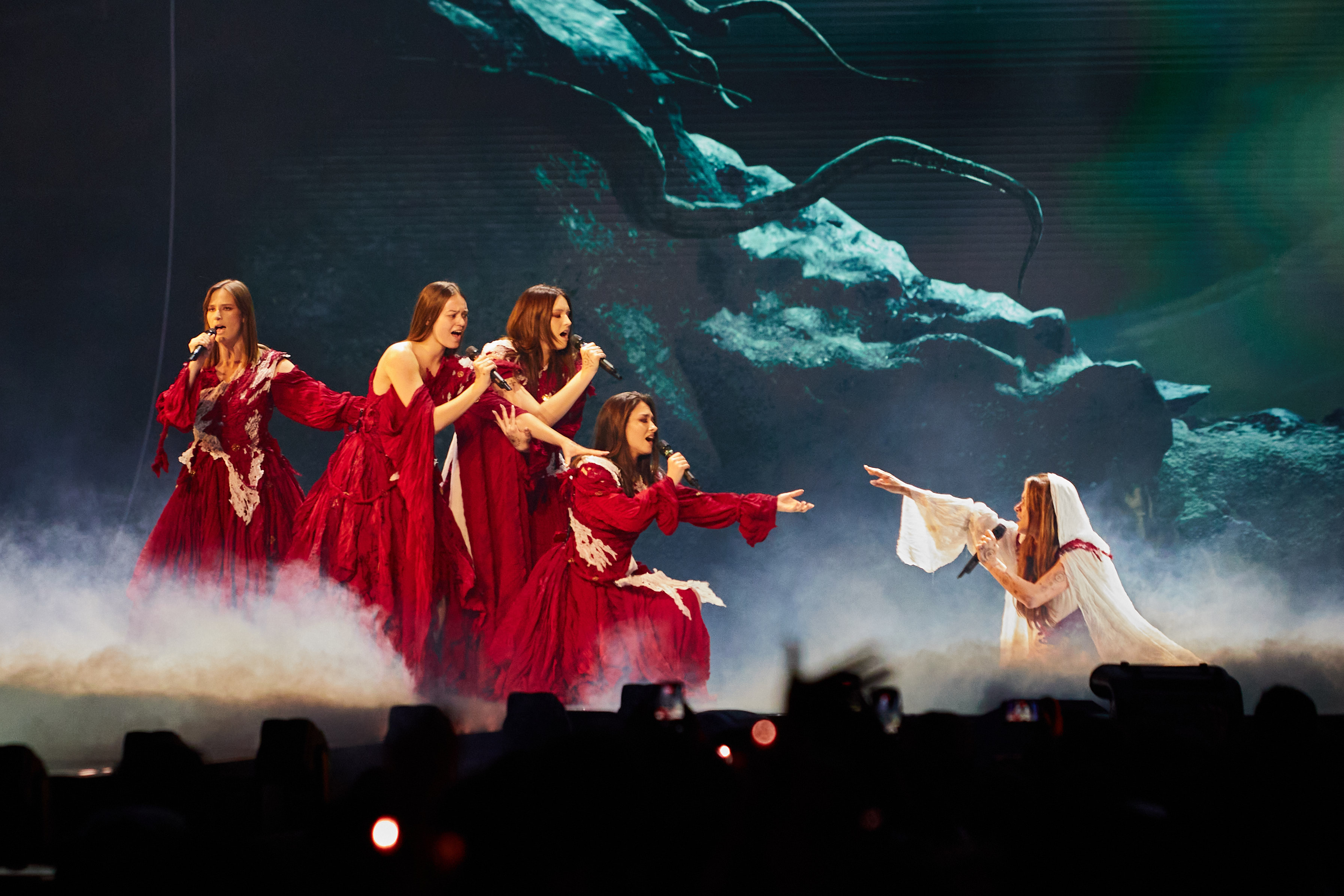
Lelek performing "Andromeda" during the Eurovision 2026 final

For their Eurovision performance, the staging was directed by Jasmin Cvišić, who also served as Serbia's staging director in 2022 and 2023. One of the group members was dressed in a white dress with red elements, symbolically representing a woman who sacrifices herself which is inspired by the song's themes, while the other four members were wearing dark red dresses with white details. The costumes were once more designed by Diamane, who also styled the outfit of the 2026 Serbian representatives Lavina. He explained that the white fabric was meant to suggest melted candle wax and its associations with memory, prayer, and protection, among others, while the dark red fabric represented female resistance. Appearing on the talk show Kod nas doma following their win at Dora, the group said they changed the costumes and the staging to suit a larger venue and audience.

The performance opened with the group crossing the long bridge linking the Green Room to the main stage, a shot framed to give their arrival a ceremonial feel. Pyrotechnics were used later in the performance, and an LED backdrop moved through a sequence of images echoing the song's music video, opening on a dim, cave-like setting before shifting to a forest and finally to a fast-moving, wormhole-like effect as the song ended. "Andromeda" finished sixth in the semi-final, scoring 175 points and securing a position for the grand final.

Lelek performed a repeat of their performance in the grand final on 16 May. The group performed 13th, after Bulgaria's Dara and before the United Kingdom's Look Mum No Computer. The group finished 15th with 124 points, with a split score of 53 points from the juries and 71 points from public televoting. Regarding the former, the song did not receive any sets of 12 points; the most a country gave was an eight from Montenegro and Portugal. On the other hand, the song received one set of 12 points from the public televote given by Serbia. In response to their result, the group expressed satisfaction with their performance and the unique experience of participating in Eurovision. Judita Štorga, one of the group members, mentioned that reaching the grand final is a "major victory" and a "huge achievement" for them and for their entire team.

==== Controversy with Israeli broadcaster ====
Following the first semi-final, the Israeli public broadcaster Kan published a post on social media featuring an image of Lelek. Written in Hebrew, the post stated, "When you overdo it with the henna tattoos in Eilat", in reference to the traditional sicanje facial markings worn by the group members. Lelek responded to the post on Instagram, stating that they were disturbed by the comments and asserting that the broadcaster had mocked their culture and the historical sacrifices of oppressed Catholic women. The group added that it was "disturbing to ridicule women singing about female pain and suffering while showing such a complete lack of empathy and respect for the suffering of others". In a statement on the platform X, the broadcaster stated that it had immediately removed the post and that there was "no intention to insult the Croatian delegation or the Croatian public". Kan apologized for the publication and stated that they intended to pass along the apology straight to the head of Croatia's Eurovision delegation.

== Credits and personnel ==
Credits are adapted via Tidal.

Musicians

- Lelek – lead vocals
- Marin Novaković – background vocals
- Zorica Pajić – background vocals

Technical

- Thomas "Plec" Johannson – mastering, mixing
- Filip Lacković – mixing, production
- Andreas Björkman – mixing
- Jonas Ekdahl – mixing
- Tomislav Roso – executive production

== Charts ==
Chart performance for "Andromeda"
Chart (2026)	Peak position
Austria (Ö3 Austria Top 40)	41
Croatia (Billboard)	12
Croatia Domestic Airplay (Top lista)	1
Greece International (IFPI)	77
Sweden Heatseeker (Sverigetopplistan)	18
UK Singles Sales (OCC)	97

== Release history ==
Release dates and formats for "Andromeda"
Region	Date	Format(s)	Version	Label	Ref.
Various	9 January 2026	Digital download; streaming	Original	Self-released	
Various	6 March 2026	Digital download; streaming	Instrumental	Self-released	
Various	25 March 2026	Digital download; streaming	Acoustic	HRT	
