= Christian tattooing in Bosnia and Herzegovina =

Tattooing custom prevalent among Catholics in Ottoman Bosnia and Herzegovina

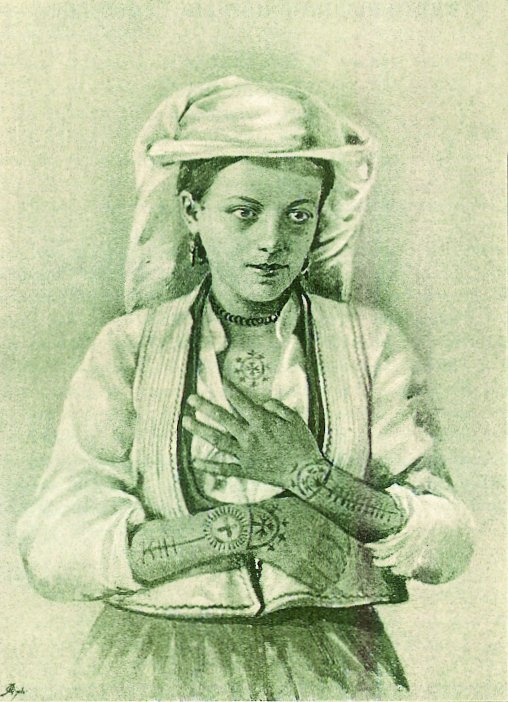
Drawing of a Bosnian tattooed woman from the late 19th century.

Sicanje, bocanje or bockanje was a traditional tattoo custom practiced mostly among the Catholic Croat community in Bosnia and Herzegovina, and to a lesser extent in present-day Croatian region of Dalmatia, mainly by teenage girls, but also boys.

== History ==
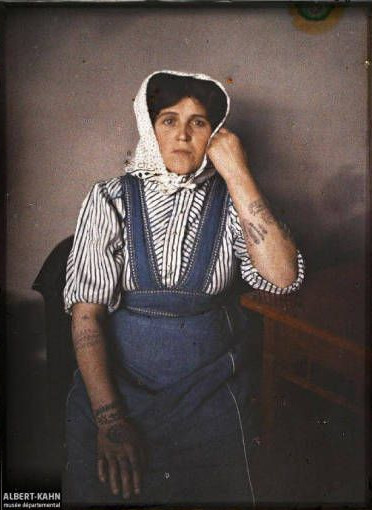
Sarajevan Catholic, 1912. By Auguste Léon.

Tattooing of young girls and boys in Bosnia and Herzegovina is colloquially called sicanje, bocanje or bockanje, and it was a widespread custom mostly among Catholic Croats in the central regions. Archaeologist Ćiro Truhelka researched these types of tattoos in the late 19th century, becoming one of the first to write about them and to illustrate them. In 1894, a Bosnian-based doctor named Leopold Glück published an article in Vienna titled Die Tätowirung der Haut bei den Katholiken Bosniens und der Herzegowina (The Tattooing of Skin Among the Catholics of Bosnia and Herzegovina) detailing the tattoos observed among the locals.

Women in some parts of the country tattooed their hands and other visible parts of their bodies (such as the brow, cheeks, wrist, or below the neck) with Christian symbols and stećak ornaments. Boys were also tattooed with the same symbols mostly above the elbow on the right arm, chest, forehead, and pointer finger. This can be seen today, not only in Bosnia and Herzegovina but among ethnic Croats from Bosnia and Herzegovina living abroad. Children were tattooed from as early as the age of six, usually during the period between the feast of Saint Joseph in March to the feast of Saint John the Baptist in June.

Catholics tattooed their children in order to save them from devshirme, while women were tattooed in hopes of avoiding enslavement or to avoid conversion to Islam in general.

== Geographical extent in Bosnia and Herzegovina and Croatia ==
The practice of traditional tattooing was recorded in nearly all regions of Bosnia and Herzegovina where Croats live. Exceptions are the areas around Banja Luka, Derventa and parts of southern Herzegovina.

In Croatia, the practice of traditional tattooing was recorded in some villages of the Šibenik hinterland, including the municipalities of Muć, Kijevo, Unešić, Klis and Šibenik itself. It was also recorded in villages in southern Dalmatia bordering Bosnia and Herzegovina in the municipalities of Ston, Metković and in one Slavonian village in the municipality of Osijek.

== Folk explanation of traditional tattooing ==
Many explanations for the practice of traditional tattooing among Croats of Bosnia and Herzegovina are recorded. The ethnologist Mario Petrić categorised the explanations into the following groups:

- A sign of Christianity
- A sign of Catholicism
- Prevention of conversions to Islam
- Decoration
- A sign for endurance of pain
- Other explanations (e.g.: Ottoman violence, mimicking Christ's suffering on the Cross, mutual recognition of Catholics, etc.)

Other recorded explanations include the hope of Catholic parents to recognise their children who were forcibly recruited as soldiers and other protective functions against forced and involuntary conversion to Islam.

== Motifs ==
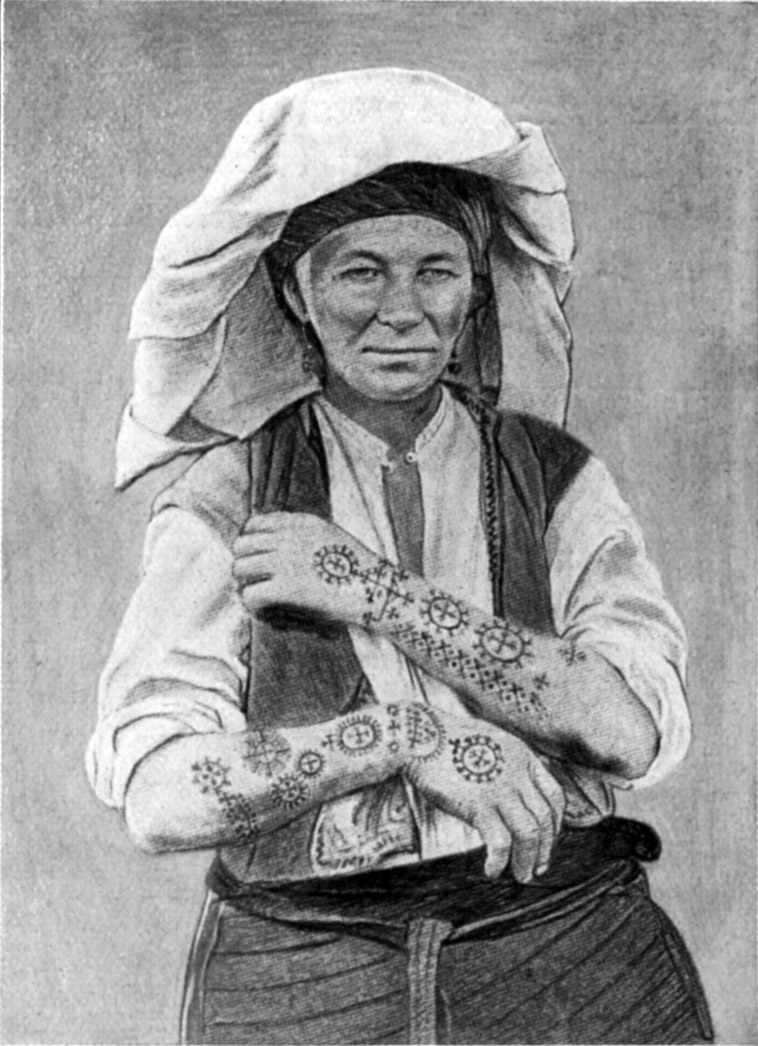
Tattoos on a Catholic woman from the Lašva Valley in central Bosnia.

The most common and widespread symbols tattooed were the cross (križ), bracelet (narukvica), fence (ograda) and branches or twigs (grančica).

The cross had numerous variations, with one of the most common ones included small branch-like lines called "grančica" or "jelica" (pine tree). Bracelet-like designs were sometimes tattooed around the women's wrists, either with crosses or a fence-like motif. There were many non-Christian, or pagan symbols used, the most common consisting of circles believed to be connected to the traditional circle ("kolo") dances of the villages. The pagan and Christian symbols were mixed together indiscriminately, with the first originating from nature and family in Illyrian times, and the other with later adapted Christian meaning. The most common areas to tattoos were the arms and hands (including fingers), and on the chest and forehead..

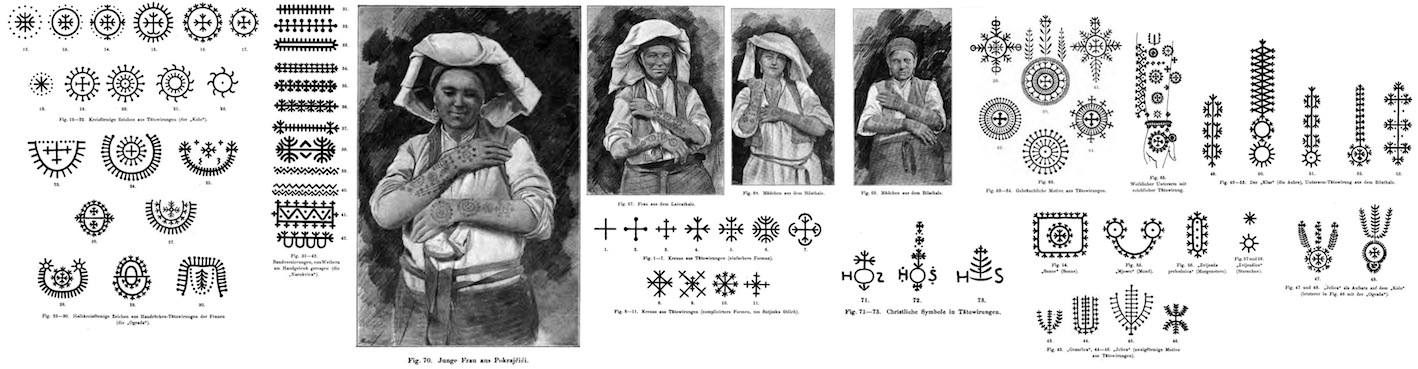
Traditional tattooing

== Modern ==
The custom of tattooing young girls and boys died out after World War II in Yugoslavia with the establishment of the FPR Yugoslavia, and tattoos done by the traditional method are now only seen on old women. Today, there is a growing trend of modern tattoo artists utilising the traditional designs with contemporary tattooing methods in Croatia and Bosnia and Herzegovina.

== In media ==
In 2013, a documentary titled Sicanje, bocanje, tetoviranje aired on Croatian television channel HRT 3. In 2011, Vice published an article titled "The Croatian Tattooed Grandma Cult" about the phenomena. Furthermore, Vice Serbia released a story and short film titled Tetovirane bake (Tattooed Grandmas), where they interview various Bosnian Croat women about their tattoos.

The Croatian girl group Lelek, who represented Croatia at the Eurovision Song Contest 2026 with the song "Andromeda", heavily features the tattoos in their styling.

== Related practices ==
The practice of tattooing on the Balkans, which also has been present among Albanians and also Vlach women from Greece, Macedonia.

The Eastern Orthodox Slavic population abhorred this practice.

In the 1st century BC, the Greek historian Strabo wrote of tattooing among inhabitants of this area, namely Illyrians and Thracians, along with other customs.

== See also ==
- Albanian traditional tattooing
- Religious perspectives on tattooing

== Bibliography ==
- Durham, Edith (2004). Bejtullah D. Destani (ed.). Albania and the Albanians: Selected Articles and Letters, 1903–1944. I.B.Tauris. ISBN 1850439397.
- Durham, Edith (1928). Some tribal origins, laws and customs of the Balkans.
- Haluga, Vesna (2023). Pretra Somek (ed.). Znamen na koži - tradicijska tetovaža žena Hrvatica, katolkinja iz Bosne i Hercegovine,2023. Nedeljko Dominović. ISBN 9789537954857.
- Jukić, Monika (2013). "Tradicionalno tetoviranje Hrvata u Bosni i Hercegovini – bocanje kao način zaštite od Osmanlija". Lucius - Zbornik radova Društva studenata povijesti Hrvatskih studija "Ivan Lučić - Lucius" (in Croatian). 12 (18/19). Zagreb: Hrvatski studiji, University of Zagreb: 197–218. ISSN 1333-6185.
- Lelaj, Olsi (2015). "Mbi tatuazhin në shoqërinë shqiptare" [On Tattoo in the Albanian Society]. Kultura Popullore. 34 (71–72). Centre of Albanological Studies: 91–118. ISSN 2309-5717.
- Norman, Camilla (2018). "Illyrian Vestiges in Daunian Costume: tattoos, string aprons and a helmet". In Gianfranco De Benedittis (ed.). Realtà medioadriatiche a confronto: contatti e scambi tra le due sponde. Atti del convegno Termoli 22-23 luglio 2016. Campobasso: Università degli Studi del Molise. pp. 57–71.
- Petrić, Mario (1973). Običaj tatauiranja kod balkanskih naroda – karakteristike, uloga i porijeklo (Thesis) (in Croatian). Sarajevo. OCLC 447103352.
- Tirta, Mark (2004). Petrit Bezhani (ed.). Mitologjia ndër shqiptarë (in Albanian). Tirana: Mësonjëtorja. ISBN 99927-938-9-9.
- Treimer, Karl (1971). "Zur Rückerschliessung der illyrischen Götterwelt und ihre Bedeutung für die südslawische Philologie". In Henrik Barić (ed.). Arhiv za Arbanasku starinu, jezik i etnologiju. Vol. I. R. Trofenik. pp. 27–33.
