= 12 Bar Club =

Former music venue in London

Coordinates: 51.551182°N 0.110462°W

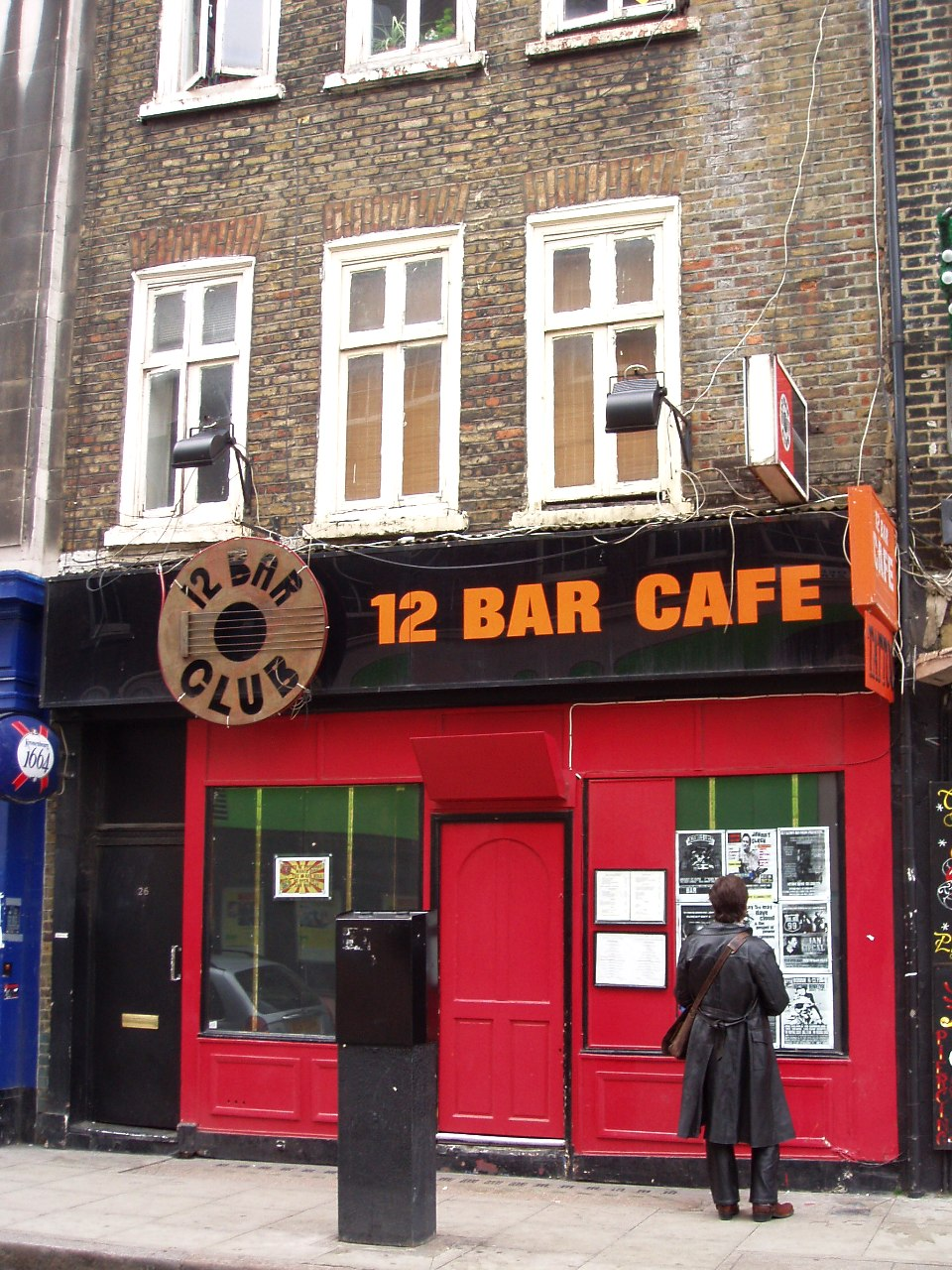
- The 12 Bar Club in 2008
- Interactive map of 12 Bar Club
- Address: 203 Holloway Road (2015–2016); 26 Denmark Street (1994–2015)
- Location: London, England
- Owner: Carlo 'Fagin' Mattiucci
- Capacity: 150 (Denmark Street)
- Type: nightclub
- Events: blues, rock, punk, folk, antifolk

Construction
- Opened: 1994
- Closed: 2016

The 12 Bar Club was a music venue in London that opened in 1994 on Denmark Street – known as Britain's "Tin Pan Alley" – just off Charing Cross Road and close to Soho.

Some of the most famous musicians and groups to play at the 12 Bar before they reached a wider audience include Adele, Martha Wainwright, Joanna Newsom, KT Tunstall (all of whose first London dates were at the 12 Bar), Damien Rice, Rolf Harris, Regina Spektor, The Libertines, Keane, Seasick Steve and Jamie T. Jeff Buckley also played an impromptu set at the 12 Bar before the launch of his debut album Grace.

The Denmark Street venue officially closed 16 January 2015 as part of a redevelopment for the area, despite a lengthy battle to keep it open. Shortly after its closure, activists occupied the building and re-opened it to live music. Property owners attempted to evict the activists. The club relocated to Islington, shutting for good a year later. The original Denmark Street venue reopened as The Lower Third in 2022.

== History ==
The building was originally constructed in 1635 as a stable. It was later converted into a forge for the St Giles area that was used until World War I. (The fireplace from the forge could be seen at the rear of the stage and regularly housed the performers' guitar amplifiers. The new stage for The Lower Third is built to one side of the forge, revealing lower sections of it previously concealed by the 12 Bar stage.) The building then became a carpenter's shop until shortly after World War II, when it was converted into store rooms. It is a Grade-II listed building.

During the 1980s, parts of the premises (later to become the area around the bottom of the stairs up to the 12 Bar toilets) housed science fiction/comic book shop Paradise Alley, with the entrance in the side alley connecting Denmark Street to Denmark Place (directly facing the rear fire exit of larger science fiction shop Forbidden Planet 2). The painted-over Paradise Alley store sign would remain over the former entrance until 2015.

Later, the premises were used by the owners of the nearby vegetarian restaurant, Food for Thought, as a storage area and sleeping quarters.

During the early 1990s, the building housed The Forge Folk & Blues Club, founded by Andy Preston who organised the performances and Nida Daniel who managed admissions and refreshments for customers. It was initially a social club and music venue for the staff at the guitar centre, who used the original forge area at the back as an amplifier workshop – dust sheets would be thrown over the amplifiers in the evening before the entertainment began.

== 12 Bar Club ==
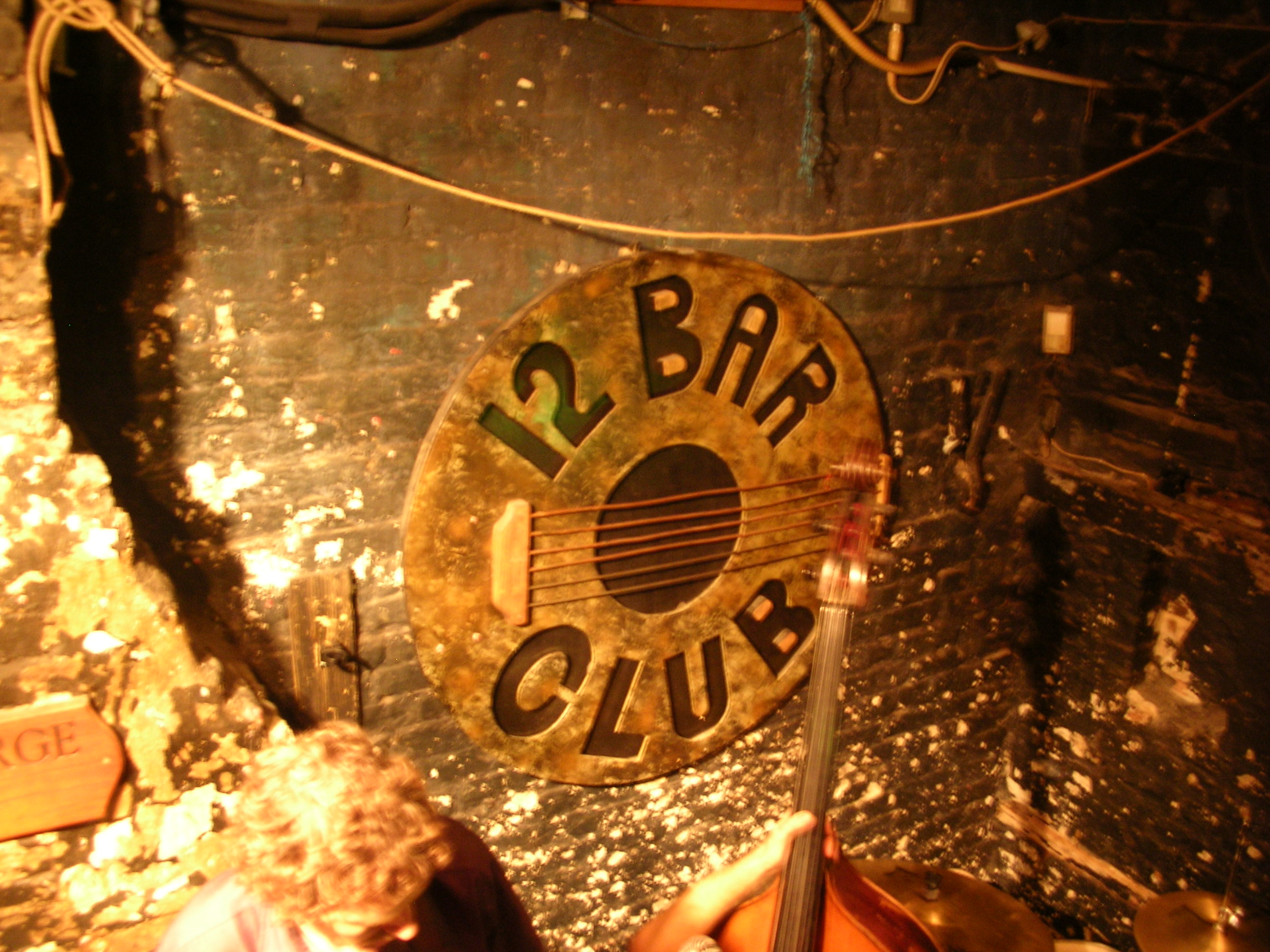
The 12 Bar Club logo on main stage

In 1994, the club was expanded and renamed the 12 Bar Club. Offices and a restaurant were added. It was the brainchild of international businessman Lars Ericson and musician Phil Ryan. They approached lease holder Andy Preston, owner of the world-famous Andy's Guitars, and together they formed up to create and launch the club in 1994. The club was run by Ryan, who devised the music policy and booked a host of well-known names including Bert Jansch, whose album Live at the 12 Bar: An Authorised Bootleg was recorded there in 1995, Robyn Hitchcock, Nick Harper, The Albion Band, Steve Jones, Tom Russell, Peter Rowan and the Rowan brothers, Boo Hewerdine, Gordon Giltrap, Jonathan Kalb, Richard Mazda, Suzanne Chawner, Ian Crowther, Vince McCann, and Will Kevans. Some of these named artists went on to promote their own nights featuring the best in up-and-coming artists. Under the guidance of Phil Ryan, the club won the Time Out Best Music Venue in 2005, which Ryan collected at the Time Out headquarters.

The club became a destination for many artists from around the world. Music manager Andy Lowe, a former employee of Decca Records, was also instrumental in attracting up-and-coming and established artists.

The Denmark Street venue was known for its two-level viewing arrangement, despite its small size. A small "balcony" section (allowing for 15 or 20 people) originally prevented those standing at the back on the ground level from seeing the heads of particularly tall band members. A refurbishment in 2006 corrected this problem by reducing the size of the balcony.

== Notable performances ==
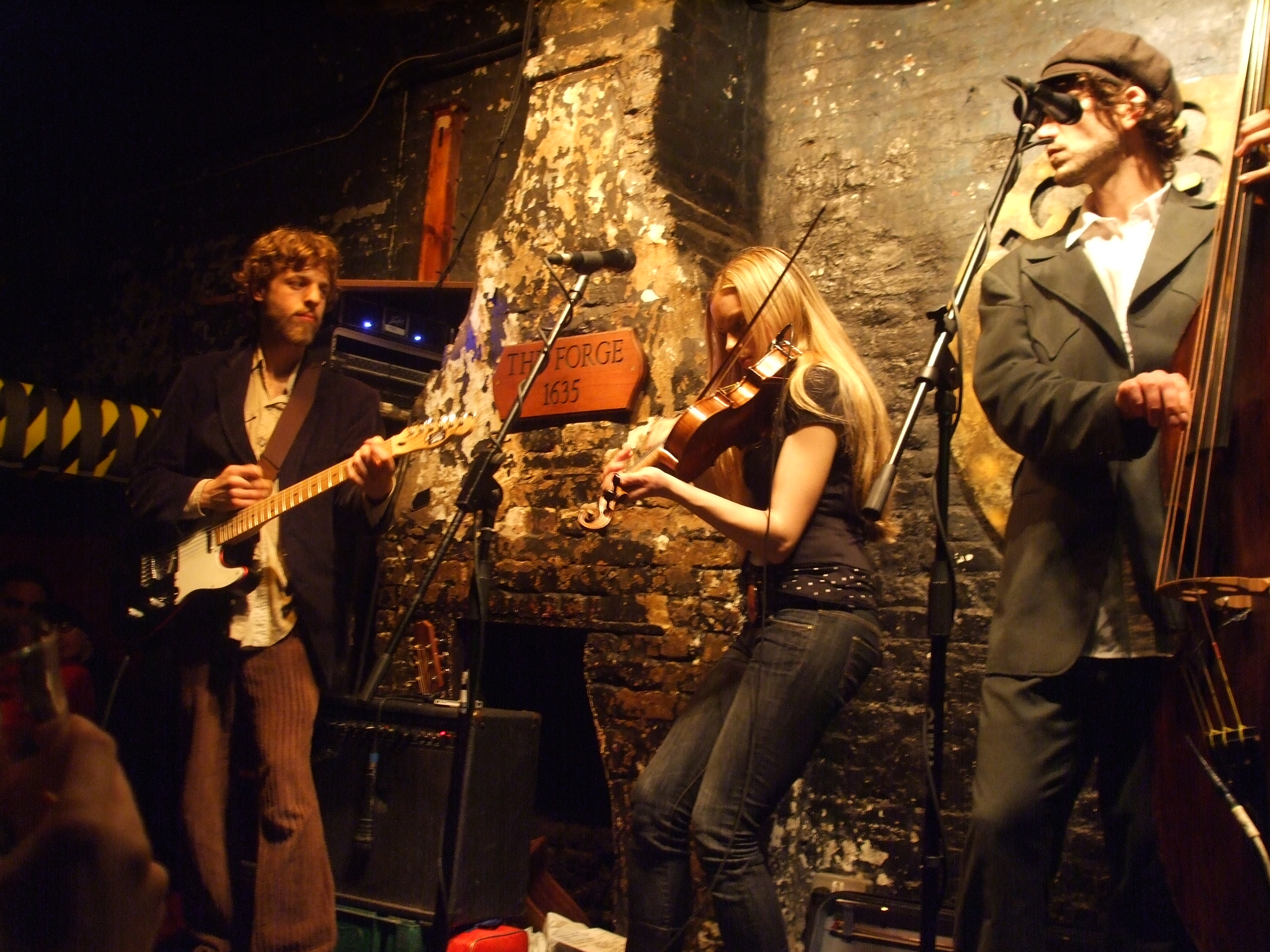
Kendel Carson performing in 2008

Bands and performers who have played at the 12 Bar after gaining more commercial success (sometimes playing 'secret' or late shows) include Cholesterol Jones, the Lene Lovich Band (who made their live debut at the club in 2012), Kristin Hersh, Pete Doherty, The Television Personalities and Robyn Hitchcock.

The venue was known for supporting independent promoters and less mainstream styles of music, notably hardcore punk and antifolk – the seasonal antifolk (UK) fest was held at the 12 Bar and many 'antifolk' style performers from both New York and England have played there, including Langhorne Slim, Jeffrey Lewis, Major Matt Mason, Curtis Eller, Thomas Truax, and Filthy Pedro, either at the fests themselves or like-minded nights such as Joe 'Sgt Buzfuz' Murphy's monthly 'Blang' night. Also, early in their career, The Libertines played at the venue.

Other bands such as Menace, London, Rivulets, The Bleach Boys, Ray Wylie Hubbard, Sarah Gillespie, Lloyd Maines, Benjamin Shaw, Jack Hayter, Monkish, Andy White, Cud and Rhatigan, Terri Hendrix and Roddy Frame of Aztec Camera also played at the 12 Bar Club.

== Awards ==
The 12 Bar Club was awarded Live music Venue of the Year '95/'96 by Time Out magazine.

In 2012, London newspaper The Telegraph ranked the 12 Bar Club as the second-best venue in the world.

== Closure and protests ==
Property developers Consolidated Developments, in partnership with the Crossrail Project, sought to terminate the 12 Bar Club's lease as part of an ongoing development programme around Denmark Street. It resulted in an 18-month lawsuit and significant protests. A petition against the closure drew 17,000 signatures, including Marc Almond, David Essex, Glen Matlock, Pete Townshend and local MP Frank Dobson, but it did not save the club.

The club held a farewell party on 11 January 2015, with 30 bands playing. It officially closed its Denmark Street venue on 16 January, but within days, activists entered the building in protest. Members of the group, calling themselves "Bohemians 4 Soho," told The Guardian newspaper, "We are a collective of artists, activists and campaigners who are willing to become cultural heritage wardens for the area." Under the motto "without culture, society cannot exist," the group stated it wanted to preserve Tin Pan Alley.

On Friday, 23 January, an injunction order was affixed to a facility door prohibiting the occupants from holding a party, playing music or distributing alcohol. The order was ignored and a large party was held that night with live music. Consolidated Developments took legal action to evict the activists. The Bohemians stated they were squatting not only to protest the closure of the 12 Bar Club, but also to preserve the building from demolition. The occupants provided police with a Section 6 notice to defend their occupation.

Whilst commentators lamented the closure of another central London music venue, Frank Turner played an impromptu gig in support of the squatters. They were evicted in early February 2015. The police reported there were 15-20 people in the building and there were no arrests.

== Revivals ==
The club's owner announced that the 12 Bar Club would be relocated to Islington. The 12 Bar Club moved to Phibber's Bar & Grill on Holloway Road, but ceased trading on 2 February 2016.

The original Denmark Street venue reopened as The Lower Third in the summer of 2022 as part of the Outernet London development. The venue includes a small music room in the forge room, the space where the original 12 Bar Club music room was located.

== Literary references ==
The protagonist of the Cormoran Strike series of crime fiction novels (written by J. K. Rowling under the pseudonym Robert Galbraith) is a detective who works and lives above the 12 Bar Club's original Denmark Street location.
