= Nipplepeople =

Croatian electronic music duo

nipplepeople
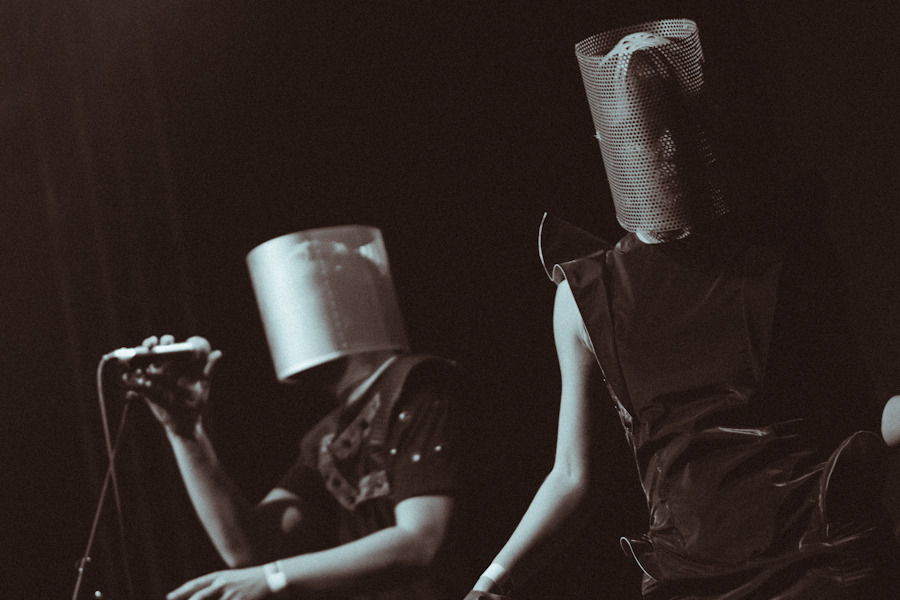
- Nipplepeople in 2012

Background information
- Origin: Zagreb, Croatia
- Genres: electronic; dance
- Years active: 2008–present
- Label: The Elkcloner

Nipplepeople (stylised in lowercase) is a Croatian electronic music duo formed in 2008 in Zagreb. They are known for their anonymity, performing with masks and avoiding personal identification. The duo's music is often characterized as downtempo or synthwave. The duo is known for their cover of Zdenka Kovačiček's song "Frka", which became a hit in Croatia and Serbia.

Their breakthrough single, "Sutra", released in 2010, won the Loud & Queer Award for Single of the Year in Serbia. Over the years, Nipplepeople has performed at some regional festivals, including Exit, Sea Star and Terraneo. Despite maintaining a low-profile public presence, the duo's music resonates strongly with fans and has garnered a significant following within the LGBTQ+ community.

== History ==
Their debut single, "Broj", was released in early 2009, with its music video, a live performance from MTV Adria's Hitorama, premiering two years later in February 2011.

In March 2017, Nipplepeople released their rendition of Zdenka Kovačiček's 1981 hit "Frka". The music was composed by Kire Mitrev, while the lyrics were adapted from Slavica Maras's poetry collection Konstatacija jedne mačke.

On 5 December 2024, Nipplepeople were announced as one of 24 participants in Dora 2025, the Croatian national selection for the Eurovision Song Contest 2025, with the song "Znak". On 1 March 2025, they finished seventh in the Dora final.

== Discography ==
=== Compilation albums ===
Title	Details
Singles	Released: 25 June 2017; Label: Self-released; Format: Digital download, streaming

=== Singles ===
Title	Year	Peak chart positions	Album
Title	Year	CRO Dom.	Album
"Broj"	2009	*	Singles
"Sutra"	2010	*	Singles
"Ne volim te"	2011	*	Singles
"Bolji"	2012	*	Singles
"Tebi"	2014	*	Singles
"Balkan Express"	2015	*	Singles
"Frka"	2017	*	Singles
"Nikada"	2018	*	Non-album singles
"Disco epileptik"	2019	*	Non-album singles
"Tajna"	2020	*	Non-album singles
"Jelena"	2022	—	Non-album singles
"Ti i ja" (with Filip Mitrović)	2023	—	Sunce mamino (Original Motion Picture Soundtrack)
"U mrak" (with Filip Mitrović)	2024	—	Sunce mamino (Original Motion Picture Soundtrack)
"Znak"	2025	—	Dora 2025
"Utjeha" (with Natali Dizdar)	2025	17	Non-album single

=== Guest appearances ===
Title	Year	Other artist(s)	Album
"Sanjam"	2010	Agramsville	Yammat kompilacija
"Sutra" (Agramsville remix)	2010	Agramsville	Yammat kompilacija
"Most" (Nipplepeople rework)	2018	Mayales	Non-album songs
"Gledano sa strane" (Live Dom sportova 2018)	2019	Detour	Non-album songs
"Ti i ja (Žurka)"	2024	Filip Mitrović	Sunce mamino (Original Motion Picture Soundtrack)

== Awards ==
List of awards and nominations of Nipplepeople
Year	Country	Award	Category	Work	Result	Ref.
2011	Serbia	Loud & Queer Awards	Single of the Year	"Sutra"	Won	
2017	Croatia	Ambasador Awards	Electronic Band of the Year	themselves	Won	
2018	Croatia	Ambasador Awards	Electronic Band of the Year	themselves	Won	
2020	Croatia	Ambasador Awards	Electronic Band of the Year	themselves	Nominated	
2021	Croatia	Ambasador Awards	Disco, Dance or Electro-pop Single of the Year	"Tajna"	Nominated	
2019	Bosnia and Herzegovina; Croatia; Montenegro; North Macedonia; Serbia	2019 Music Awards Ceremony	Alternative or Electro-pop Song of the Year	"Nikada"	Won (public vote)	
2019	Bosnia and Herzegovina; Croatia; Montenegro; North Macedonia; Serbia	2019 Music Awards Ceremony	Alternative or Electro-pop Song of the Year	"Nikada"	Nominated (radio stations)	
