= Poison Cake =

2025 song by Marko Bošnjak

Single by Marko Bošnjak
- Released: 10 January 2025
- Genre: Dark pop; EDM
- Length: 2:58
- Label: Aquarius
- Songwriters: Bas Wissink; Ben Pyne; Emma Gale; Filip Majdak; Marko Bošnjak
- Producer: Bas Wissink

Marko Bošnjak singles chronology
"Zdravo budi mladi kralju" (2024)	"Poison Cake" (2025)	"Villain" (2025)

Music videos
- "Poison Cake" on YouTube "Poison Cake" (acoustic version) on YouTube

Eurovision Song Contest 2025 entry
- Country: Croatia
- Artist: Marko Bošnjak
- Language: English
- Composers: Bas Wissink; Ben Pyne; Emma Gale; Filip Majdak; Marko Bošnjak
- Lyricists: Bas Wissink; Ben Pyne; Emma Gale; Filip Majdak; Marko Bošnjak

Finals performance
- Semi-final result: 12th
- Semi-final points: 28

Entry chronology
- ◄ "Rim Tim Tagi Dim" (2024)
- "Andromeda" (2026) ►

Official performance video
- "Poison Cake" (first semi-final) on YouTube

"Poison Cake" is a song by Bosnian Croat singer-songwriter Marko Bošnjak. Described as a story of revenge and standing up for oneself, the song was released on 10 January 2025 through Aquarius. It was written by Bošnjak, together with Bas Wissink, Ben Pyne, Emma Gale, and Filip Majdak. The song represented Croatia in the Eurovision Song Contest 2025.

== Background ==
Bošnjak received a "rough demo" version of "Poison Cake" from Emma Gale, Ben Pyne and Bas Wissink, who were stating that they "would really like [Bošnjak] to submit [the song] to Dora". The lyrics were written by the UK-based Gale and Ireland-based Pyne, while the production was handled by the Netherlands-based Wissink. Bošnjak stated that, "in contrast to other material [he is] sent to submit to Dora, this one really clicked" with him. He completed the song with the Dugave-based Croatian producer Filip Majdak. The duo made the track sound "cathartic and wild and not really linear". Bošnjak credited Majdak for the influences of industrial metal on the song, and revealed that he even wanted Majdak to scream on the track.

Bošnjak stated that making this song had been "revolutionary for him personally. It had transformed him both as an artist and as a person, and had released him from the shackles of expectations that he has to make only emotional Balkan ballads." He dubbed it his "Hannah Montana went Miley Cyrus" moment.

== Composition ==
Inspired by fairytales like "Snow White" and "Hansel and Gretel", as well as the film The Help (2011), the song is described as a story of revenge and standing up for yourself. It is further described as a track of "vengeful emotions, anger, and a desire for justice, told through a powerful metaphor of depriving those who have abused their position."

Bošnjak, in addition, said that "Poison Cake" is something completely new to him. He added, "the song is energetic and it's about something totally unexpected from me, as a musician. I think the song is of multidimensional meaning and that everyone can recognize it and experience it in their own way." Wiwibloggs described the song as "[mixing] pop, garage, opera and some very dark industrial beats".

== Release ==
On 5 December 2024, the list of Dora 2025 contestants was revealed, confirming Bošnjak's participation with "Poison Cake". He had previously taken part in Dora 2022 with "Moli za nas", finishing second behind Mia Dimšić with "Guilty Pleasure". Vocal about his desire to win Dora as an Eurovision fan, he soon became one of the favourites for victory. On 10 January 2025, all the Dora entries were released, including "Poison Cake". On 31 March 2025, Bošnjak released the acoustic version of the song.

== Critical reception ==
Professional ratings
Review scores
Source	Rating
Mixer	8/10
Yle	2/10

During an interview in the Croatian television show IN magazin, Croatian singer and actress Maja Šuput gave a positive remark on the song. She commented that "Poison Cake" was marginal for her, describing the song as "both sweet and a little demonic", and ended up supporting Bošnjak. Moreover, in an interview with Croatian online newspaper Index.hr, Serbian singer Milica Pavlović commented that she liked the song, its stage performance in Dora 2025, and "the way it goes through multiple roles". In an interview with Dalmatinski portal, the runners-up of Eurovision Song Contests 2023 and 2024—Käärijä and Baby Lasagna, respectively—both praised the song.

On the other hand, Josip Bošnjak, also writing for Index.hr, commented that the song "tries too much, and none of it quite succeeds". He further wrote, "imagine copying 'Bohemian Rhapsody' by lifting the structure, but inserting uninspired melodies and lyrics inside". Anđelo Jurkas of Mixer wrote: "The fact that Marko's English is hard, tuneless, and clumsy; that in his live performance to a backing track in Dora's semi-final and final he has neither the force nor the forte to sing the higher parts of the song without his voice cracking; that with his generally androgynous coquettishness and appearance he reconciles a mash-up of Josipa Lisac's and Božo Vrećo's affectations—in the context of the 'commission' and the commissioned work—all of this counts only as qualities and virtues for him. In an age of superficiality and lowered standards, of screaming over showbiz premises while ignoring everything else, absolutely nothing else even matters. A star is born. For those it's meant for – it's perfect." Eva Frantz from the Finnish broadcaster Yle gave the song a 2/10, describing the song as "strange and rambling, where cuteness is mixed with horror and embarrassment". Jon O'Brien from Vulture ranked the song 36th overall, deeming the track as sounding like "several songs rolled into one", from its "industrial pop verses to its creepy nursery-rhyme chants", which becomes "borderline unlistenable".

Following his Dora victory, however, Bošnjak was the target of widespread homophobic backlash online, and the song was accused of being "satanic".

== Promotion ==
=== Music video ===
The music video for "Poison Cake" was released on 21 February 2025. The video is heavily charged with symbolism: a green poison which Bošnjak pours over a cake symbolises injustice and the beginning of transformation, it is a metaphor for "all that is forbidden and suppressed in life"; a two-meter long Indian python symbolises danger, changes and liberation, it is the "opposite of security and usual norms, bringing about change that is inevitable"; the scene of Ophelia in the water is the element of "Romanticism and evokes classic fairytales, but in a more disturbing and darker manner"; the mirrors in the video reflect "internal struggles and the search for identity, and the deep, reflective scenes create a sense of inner conflict – between innocence and dark desires." Ultimately, the video features a magical tree and apples, which are allusions to fairytales such as "Snow White". The apples symbolise "temptations, but also the rewards that come through revenge, while the magical tree gives the feeling of a mysterious world in which everything can be transformed."

=== Live performances ===
To promote "Poison Cake" before the Eurovision Song Contest 2025, Bošnjak announced his intent to participate in various Eurovision pre-parties. It was first announced that he will be performing at Eurovision in Concert 2025 held at AFAS Live Arena in Amsterdam on 5 April 2025. He also participated at the London Eurovision Party 2025 on 13 April 2025 held at Here at Outernet. Further, he performed at PrePartyES 2025 on 19 April 2025 held at Sala La Riviera in Madrid.

== Eurovision Song Contest 2025 ==
=== Dora 2025 ===
Dora 2025 was the national final format organised by Croatian Radiotelevision (HRT) to select the Croatian representative for the Eurovision Song Contest 2025. For 2025, the competition saw 24 entries competing across two semi-finals, held between 27 and 28 February 2025, and a final on 2 March 2025. The qualifiers for the final from each phase were determined exclusively by a public televote, with the top eight entries from each semi-final qualifying for the final. The winner of the final was then selected by a 50/50 combination of votes from a professional jury and the Croatian public via televoting.

"Poison Cake" was drawn to compete in the second semi-final, and was announced as one of the eight qualifiers in the semi-final. In the final, the song performed 13th in the running order. It scored 83 points from the jury, placing first, and 47 points from televoting, placing fourth. With a combined total of 130 points, it ultimately won the contest and the Croatian spot for the Eurovision Song Contest 2025.

=== At Eurovision ===
The Eurovision Song Contest 2025 took place at St. Jakobshalle in Basel, Switzerland, and consisted of two semi-finals held on the respective dates of 13 and 15 May and the final on 17 May 2025. During the allocation draw held on 28 January 2025, Croatia was drawn to compete in the first semi-final, performing in the second half of the show. Bošnjak was later drawn to perform 14th, after the Netherlands' Claude and before Cyprus' Theo Evan. The song failed to qualify for the grand final, receiving 28 points and finishing twelfth in its semifinal.

== Commercial performance ==
In the week of 20 January 2025, "Poison Cake" debuted at number 31 on HR Top 100, which tracks the airplay of songs released by Croatian labels. Upon winning Dora, in the week of 10 March 2025, its eighth consecutive week on the chart, "Poison Cake" reached its peak of number one.

== Track listing ==
Digital download/streaming

1. "Poison Cake" – 2:56

Digital download/streaming – Acoustic version

1. "Poison Cake" (Acoustic) – 2:45

== Charts ==
Chart performance for "Poison Cake"
Chart (2025)	Peak position
Croatia Domestic Airplay (HR Top 100)	1

== Release history ==
Release dates and formats for "Poison Cake"
Region	Date	Format(s)	Version	Label	Ref.
Various	10 January 2025	Digital download; streaming	Original	Aquarius	
Various	31 March 2025	Digital download; streaming	Acoustic	Aquarius	
