= Mark Ramsden =

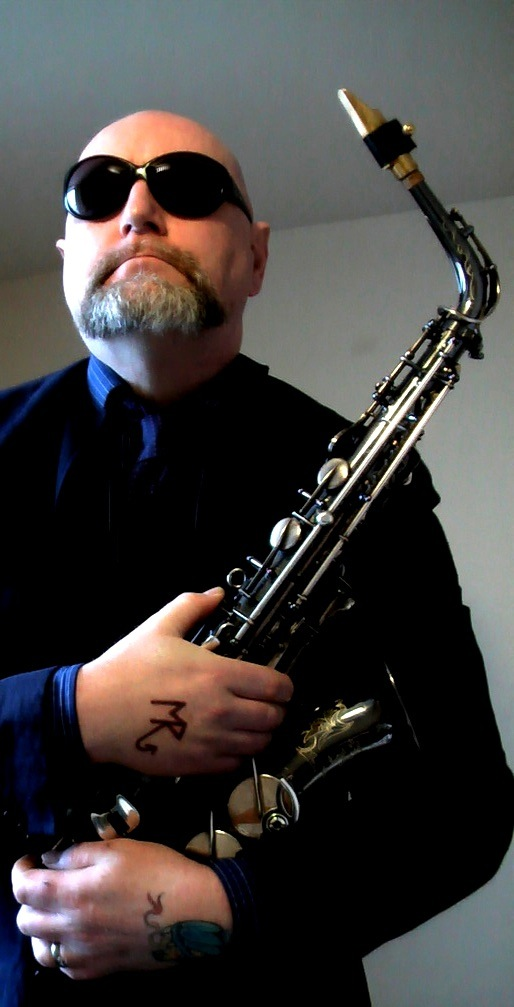
Mark Ramsden in 2010

Mark Ramsden (born 13 July 1956, Liverpool, England) is a British writer, composer, producer and musician. He studied at Leeds Music College before becoming a professional saxophonist and flautist. Since finishing his education he has been active in rock, but he is more famous for jazz music, both as a performer and composer.

== Career ==
Much of the 1980s and 1990s saw him playing with artists such as Jimmy Witherspoon, Roy Harper and Bert Jansch as well as partnering jazz musicians such as Steve Lodder, Dominic Ashworth and Jim Mullen. He has also toured with Dudu Pukwana, Loose Tubes, the National Youth Jazz Orchestra and the Grand Union Orchestra, living in Germany and Hong Kong as well as the UK.

After meeting Tom Robinson at the Edinburgh Festival in 1982 he joined the TRB, touring extensively with the band, he appeared on the albums Hope and Glory (1984), Still Loving You (1986) and Love Over Rage (1994). He part composed Tom Robinson's top ten hit "War Baby" (1983), writing and playing the distinctive tenor and soprano saxophone parts.

In 1995 he composed and recorded the pipe organ and saxophone album Above The Clouds with Steve Lodder (re-released Naxos 1999) in a North London Church. His other critically acclaimed work includes Chilled with Jim Mullen and Andy Hamill and Tribute to Paul Desmond with Dave Cliff.

In addition to his musical career, he has written reviews, profiles and technical pieces for Musician magazine, Making Music, Crime Time, and life style pieces for Dempster's magazine where he interviewed Marianne Faithfull. He has also regularly published fiction and articles for titles such as Skin Two, Latex Extra, Desire and The Erotic Review. His articles appeared in many fetish magazines. He was editor of Fetish Times in the mid-1990s and until 2009 was a regular columnist for Forum Magazine. In 2008 he published the young adult novel War School. He has completed a collaboration with his wife, illustrator Ruth Ramsden, on the Dark Tantra Tarot tarot deck. In August 2015, he published: Dread - The Art of Serial Killing, with Number 13 Press. and in November 2018, he published Mistress Murder with Fahrenheit Press.

== Books ==
- The Dark Magus and the Sacred Whore (Serpents Tail 1999) ISBN 1-85242-598-9
- The Dungeon Master's Apprentice (Serpents Tail 1999) ISBN 1-85242-623-3
- Radical Desire – non fiction with Housk Randall (Serpents Tail 2000) ISBN 1-85242-653-5
- The Sacred Blood (Serpents Tail 2001) ISBN 1-85242-681-0
- War School (Matador 2008) ISBN 1-906510-18-0
- Radical Desire: Kink & Magickal Sex - non fiction with Ruth Ramsden (Mandrake Of Oxford 2012) ISBN 978-1906958190
- Dread - The Art of Serial Killing (Number 13 Press 2015) ASIN B0137R82FM
- Mistress Murder (Fahrenheit Press 2018) ISBN 978-1912526376

== Additional sources ==
- Jazz Journal Jazz Journal
- Rough Guide to Jazz by Ian Carr, Digby Fairweather & Brian Priestly ISBN 1-84353-256-5
- Garden of Uranium
- When The Circus Comes To Town
