= Steve Lodder =

British jazz musician

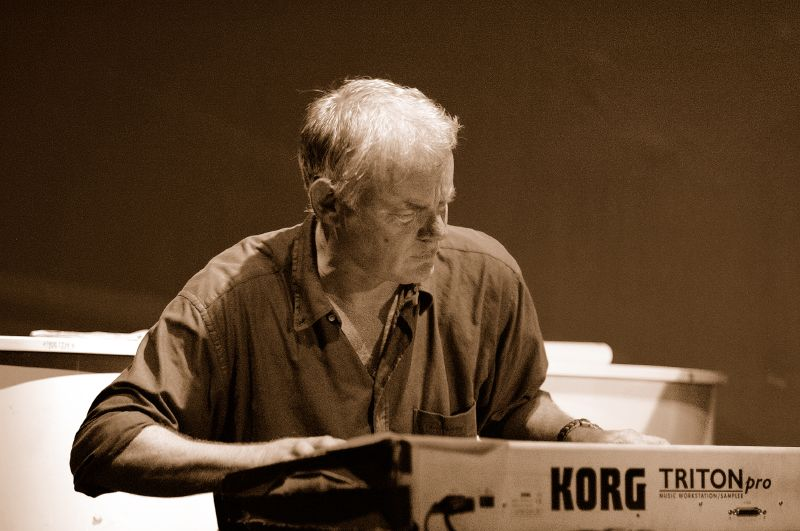
Lodder in 2005

Steve Lodder, born Stephen John Lodder (born 10 April 1951, St. Helier, Jersey), is a British keyboardist, composer, and organist. He played piano as a child and took up organ at age 14. He studied organ at Gonville and Caius College, and after completing his studies he taught music and wrote for film and television.

== Career ==
Lodder became active in jazz music, playing with Maggie Nicols, John Etheridge, Harry Beckett, and Deirdre Cartwright. He toured with George Russell in the 1980s, and in 1989 accompanied Carol Grimes; later that year he toured with Simply Red.

Since 1989 Lodder has worked with Andy Sheppard, on several projects (including Soft on the Inside, Co-Motion, Inclassifiable, and 20th century Saxophones). He plays synthesizer on some of Sheppard's work. He has led his own small ensembles since 1992. In 1994 he accompanied Ernestine Anderson and worked with Brazilian ensemble Nois.

From 1995 Lodder worked with Paul McCartney on his Standing Stone composition, which was premiered and recorded in 1997. In 1996 he recorded on church organ with saxophonist Mark Ramsden. He returned to tour with George Russell from 1997, and was with Carla Bley in 1998 for performances of Escalator Over the Hill. His first release under his own name was 2001's Bout Time 2. He is the regular keyboardist with the Alison Rayner Quintet.

== Books ==
- Stevie Wonder: A Musical Guide to the Classic Albums by Steve Lodder (2005)
- Totally Interactive Keyboard Bible by Steve Lodder, Janette Mason (2008)
- Classic Hammond Organ: Know the Players, Play the Music by Steve Lodder (2008)
- The Hammond Organ Key Master by Steve Lodder (2008)

== Sources ==
- Gary W. Kennedy, "Steve Lodder". Grove Jazz online.
- Interview with Jazzwise.
