= Crimson Moon =

Studio album by Bert Jansch
- Released: 15 August 2000
- Recorded: Late 1999 − early 2000
- Studio: Jansch's home studio
- Genre: Folk
- Label: When!
- Producer: Bert Jansch

Bert Jansch chronology
Toy Balloon (1998)	Crimson Moon (2000)	Dazzling Stranger: The Bert Jansch Anthology (2000)

Crimson Moon is the 21st album by Scottish folk musician Bert Jansch, released in 2000. Johnny Marr and Bernard Butler play guitar on the album.

== Critical reception ==
Professional ratings
Review scores
Source	Rating
AllMusic	3.5/5 stars
The Encyclopedia of Popular Music	3/5 stars

NPR deemed the album "quietly stunning." The Guardian called it "unremittingly pleasant." The Birmingham Post wrote that "the earnestness of 1998's Toy Balloon gives way here to some of Bert's finest singing and picking, bringing a loose, jazzy vitality to the title track, revisiting his roots on 'Caledonia' and producing an emotive reading of Robin Williamson's 'October Song'."

== Track listing ==
All tracks are written by Bert Jansch except as noted.

No.	Title	Writer(s)	Length
1.	"Caledonia"		4:48
2.	"Going Home"		3:12
3.	"Crimson Moon"		5:26
4.	"Downunder"		2:53
5.	"October Song" (cover of the Incredible String Band, 1966)	Robin Williamson	3:41
6.	"Looking for Love"		4:25
7.	"Fool's Mate"		6:59
8.	"The River Bank"		2:52
9.	"Omie Wise"	Traditional	5:01
10.	"My Donald" (cover of Owen Hand, 1964)	Owen Hand	4:04
11.	"Neptune's Daughter"		3:21
12.	"Singing the Blues" (cover of Guy Mitchell, 1956)	Melvin Endsley	2:17

== Personnel ==
- Bert Jansch - guitar, vocals
- Johnny Marr - guitar, harmonica, backing vocals
- Bernard Butler - guitar
- Johnny "Guitar" Hodge - guitar, harmonica
- Loren Jansch - vocals
- Adam Jansch - bass
- Makoto Sakamoto - drums, percussion
