= The Ornament Tree =

Studio album by Bert Jansch
- Released: November 1990
- Recorded: 1990 at Heartbeat Sound, London
- Genre: Folk
- Length: 43:41
- Label: Run River
- Producer: Michael Klein

Bert Jansch chronology
Sketches (1990)	The Ornament Tree (1990)	When the Circus Comes to Town (1995)

Professional ratings
Review scores
Source	Rating
Allmusic	3/5 stars

The Ornament Tree is the 18th album by Scottish folk musician Bert Jansch, released virtually simultaneously with another album, Sketches.

== Track listing ==
All songs Traditional unless otherwise noted.

1. "The Ornament Tree (Bonny Portmore)" - 3:50
2. "The Banks O'Sicily" (James Robertson, Hamish Henderson) - 3:33
3. "The Rambling Boys of Pleasure" - 4:40
4. "The Rocky Road to Dublin" - 2:58
5. "Three Dreamers" - 3:46
6. "The Mountain Streams" - 3:49
7. "The Blackbirds of Mullamore" - 4:47
8. "Lady Fair" - 2:15
9. "The Road Tae Dundee" - 4:07
10. "Tramps And Hawkers" - 3:15
11. "The January Man" (Dave Goulder) - 3:42
12. "Dobbins Flowery Vale" - 3:33

== Personnel ==
- Bert Jansch - guitar, vocals
- Peter Kirtley - guitar
- Nigel Portman Smith - bass, accordion
- Dave Turner - bass
- Maggie Boyle - flute, whistles, bodhran
- Paul Boyle - fiddle
- Richard Curran - fiddle
- Steve Tilston - arpeggione, mandolin
- Michael Klein - percussion, backing vocals
