= Lily of the West =

American Folksong of irish origin

"Lily of the West" (Roud 957, Laws P27) is a traditional English-language folk song, found throughout England, Ireland, Canada, and America. It is about a man who travels to either Louisville or Limerick and falls in love with a woman named Mary, Flora, or Molly, the eponymous Lily of the West. He catches Mary being unfaithful to him, and, in a fit of rage, stabs the man she is with, and is subsequently imprisoned. In spite of this, he finds himself still in love with her. In most versions, the Lily testifies in his defense and he is freed, though they do not resume their relationship.

The lyrics to the first verse, as famously sung by Joan Baez:

When first I came to Louisville, some pleasure there to find
A damsel there from Lexington was pleasing to my mind
Her rosy cheeks, her ruby lips, like arrows pierced my breast
And the name she bore was Flora, the lily of the West

- and every verse ends with a repetition of the phrase, [name], the lily of the West.

== History and traditional variants ==
=== Britain and Ireland ===
Many broadsides of the song were collected in England and Ireland around 1820–50; the English and Scottish versions generally begin "It's when I came to England some pleasure for to find", whilst the Irish broadsides began "When first I came to Ireland some pleasure for to find". Sabine Baring-Gould collected several versions from traditional singers in the English West Country in the 1890s, and George Gardiner and Charles Gamblin collected another in Dummer, Hampshire in 1906. The traditional tune is a variant of that also commonly used for the song The Lakes of Pontchartrain and it belongs to the same Irish melody-family as a song variously known as On the Trail of the Buffalo / Buffalo Skinners / The Hills of Mexico / The State of Arkansas / Boggus Creek.

Below is the first verse of a version printed in 1857 in Glasgow, Scotland, described as a "highly popular song":

It's when I came to England some pleasure for to find,

When I espied a damsel most pleasing to my mind,

Her rosie cheeks, and rolling eyes like arrows pierced my breast,

And they called her lovely Flora the Lily of the West.

=== America ===
In "The Collected Reprints from Sing Out! the Folk Song Magazine Volumes 7-12, 1964-1973" (on page 6, preceding the song's notation and lyrics), it is stated that:

“This old ballad has been kept alive over the centuries by both print and oral tradition. Originally an English street ballad (or broadside), the song became particularly popular in the United States by parlor singers and ballad-printers. During the 19th century it was known throughout the country and, in time, became part of the folk heritage. Its popularity was such that in Kansas, local versifiers used the song for a parody:"

Come all you folks of enterprise who feel inclined to roam
Beyond the Mississippi to seek a pleasant home;
Pray take a pioneer's advice, I'll point you out the best
- I mean the state of Kansas, the lily of the West

The song survived long enough in North America for audio recordings to be made of traditional versions, particularly in the Ozark region of the United States. Recordings collected by Max Hunter and performed by C.W. Ingenthron of Walnut Shade, Missouri (1958) and Fred High of Arkansas (1959) are available online via the Max Hunter Folk Collection. Irene Sargent of West Fork, Arkansas was recorded performing a version in 1960, and Lowell Harness of Leslie, Arkansas was recorded performing another in 1962. The song also had a presence in Appalachia, where Alan Lomax recorded a version performed by Eliza Pace of Hyden, Kentucky in 1937, and Evelyn Ramsey of Sodom Laurel, North Carolina had her version recorded by Mike Yates in 1980. Several Canadian versions were recorded in Newfoundland and Nova Scotia in the 1950s and 60s by Helen Creighton, Herbert Halpert and Kenneth Peacock.

== Popular recordings ==
Joan Baez recorded the song in 1961, including it on her second album; her live concerts have frequently included performances of the song well into the 2010s. Bob Dylan, The Chieftains, Bert Jansch (Live At The 12 Bar), The Flash Girls, Show of Hands, Peter, Paul and Mary (as "Flora"), Mark Knopfler, Crooked Still, and Branimir Štulić (in Croatian, titled "Usne Vrele Višnje") have also recorded the song. Arizona road band Major Lingo performed a long jam version of the song using an electric slide guitar and slightly different lyrics. Holly Near recorded a parody of the song about the lesbian scene in which the singer, a woman, was obsessed with Lily, the flora of the West.

== The Irish experience ==
The song is often interpreted as a metaphor for the English, Scots-Irish and general British and Irish experience in western early and colonial America, with nods to their earlier experiences on the margins of Ireland, Scotland, and the Borders.

The first Chieftains recording of the song, from their mid 1990s album The Long Black Veil and sung by Mark Knopfler, is set in Ireland. A later recording by The Chieftains and Rosanne Cash from The Chieftains' album Further Down the Old Plank Road, ends with the man's being released and traveling across the Atlantic to "ramble through old Ireland/And travel Scotland o'er". Despite leaving America, he finds that he is still in love and mentally fixated on the woman, known in this version as Flora.

== Bibliography ==
- Cowan, Frank. Southwestern Pennsylvania in Song and Story. Greensburg, Pa.: Privately printed (1878).
