= Dazzling Stranger: The Bert Jansch Anthology =

Compilation album by Bert Jansch
- Released: 18 September 2000
- Genre: Folk
- Label: Castle Music

Bert Jansch chronology
Crimson Moon (2000)	Dazzling Stranger: The Bert Jansch Anthology (2000)	Downunder: Live in Australia (2001)

Dazzling Stranger: The Bert Jansch Anthology is a compilation album by Scottish folk musician Bert Jansch released in August 2000. It is the first Bert Jansch compilation featuring material recorded for and owned by more than one label. Sanctuary / Castle licensed from several rightsholders to make this the most definitive Jansch compilation available.

Tracks are drawn from eighteen of the twenty-one Jansch albums up to Crimson Moon (2000) plus three Pentangle tracks and two from the Loren Auerbach album Playing The Game (1985), including the Jansch song "Is It Real?" which was unavailable in its original form due to problems locating the rightsholders to Heartbreak (1982). The two other Jansch albums not sampled were Leather Launderette (1989) and the classic Avocet (1979), the ownership of which was in question at the time of compiling.

== Track listing ==
=== Disc 1 ===
1. "Strolling Down the Highway" – 3:04
2. "Angie" – 3:12
3. "Running from Home" – 2:22
4. "Needle of Death" – 3:20
5. "It Don't Bother Me" – 4:28
6. "Lucky Thirteen" – 3:36
7. "Blackwaterside" – 3:46
8. "The First Time Ever I Saw Your Face" – 1:41
9. "Soho" – 2:59
10. "Rabbit Run" – 2:41
11. "Woe Is Love My Dear" – 2:19
12. "Bells" – 4:00
13. "Wishing Well" – 2:15
14. "Poison" – 3:15
15. "I Am Lonely" – 2:29
16. "Train Song" – 4:45
17. "Nobody's Bar" – 3:00
18. "The January Man" – 3:32
19. "Reynardine" – 5:21
20. "Rosemary Lane" – 4:03
21. "When I Get Home" – 5:00
22. "Oh My Father" – 4:10

=== Disc 2 ===
1. "Fresh As A Sweet Sunday Morning"
2. "Lost And Gone"
3. "The Blacksmith"
4. "Chambertin"
5. "You Are My Sunshine"
6. "Blues Run The Game"
7. "One to a Hundred"
8. "Sweet Mother Earth"
9. "Where Did My Life Go?"
10. "Blackbird in the Morning"
11. "Playing The Game"
12. "Is It Real?"
13. "Lady Fair"
14. "The Old Routine"
15. "Three Dreamers"
16. "The Ornament Tree"
17. "Summer Heat"
18. "Morning Brings Peace of Mind"
19. "Carnival"
20. "Toy Balloon"
21. "Looking For Love"
22. "October Song"
