= Sketches (album) =

Studio album by Bert Jansch
- Released: November 1990 in Germany
- Recorded: 1990
- Studio: O-Ton/Ougenweide Studio, Hamburg
- Genre: Folk
- Length: 46:58
- Label: Hypertension
- Producer: Danny Thompson, Bert Jansch and Peter Kirtley

Bert Jansch chronology
Leather Launderette (1989)	Sketches (1990)	The Ornament Tree (1990)

Professional ratings
Review scores
Source	Rating
Allmusic	3/5 stars

Sketches is the 17th album by Scottish folk musician Bert Jansch, released virtually simultaneously with another album, The Ornament Tree.

== Track listing ==
All tracks composed by Bert Jansch; except where indicated

1. "Ring-A-Ding Bird" - 3:53
2. "One For Jo" - 2:53
3. "Poison" - 3:41
4. "The Old Routine" - 3:22
5. "Needle of Death" - 3:52
6. "Oh My Father" - 3:13
7. "Running, Running From Home" - 2:58
8. "Afterwards" (Peter Kirtley) - 3:34
9. "Can't Hide Love" - 3:53
10. "Moonshine" - 3:32
11. "A Woman Like You" - 3:44
12. "A Windy Day" - 6:05
13. "As The Day Grows Longer Now" - 2:18

== Personnel ==
- Bert Jansch - guitar, banjo, percussion, vocals
- Peter Kirtley - guitar, percussion, backing vocals
- Danny Thompson - bass, percussion
- Steve Baker - harmonica
- Stefan Wulff - percussion
- Frank Wulff - alto flute, percussion, rainstick
