= Lelek (band) =

Croatian folk-pop band

- Lelek in 2026

Background information
- Origin: Zagreb, Croatia
- Genre: Ethno-pop
- Years active: 2024–present
- Members: Inka Večerina Perušić; Judita Štorga; Korina Olivia Rogić; Lara Brtan; Marina Ramljak
- Past members: Klaudija Pulek; Sara Jurički

Lelek (stylised in all caps) is a Croatian ethnopop all-female band formed in 2024. They represented Croatia in the Eurovision Song Contest 2026 with the song "Andromeda".

== History ==
Lelek was formed in Zagreb in 2024. Their debut single "Tanani Nani", was released on 18 November 2024, which was recorded with the lineup of Lara Brtan, Sara Jurički, Mihaela Hudicek, Ivana Pavleka, and Inka Večerina Perušić.

By the start of preparations for Dora 2025, the lineup remained intact, but shortly before the competition, Perušić left the group due to family and business reasons. She was replaced by Klaudija Pulek, who performed with the group on stage at the national selection. Pulek subsequently also left the project due to disagreements with management and began a solo career. Following her departure, Perušić rejoined the group.

On 5 December 2024, Lelek were announced as one of 24 participants in Dora 2025, the Croatian national selection for the Eurovision Song Contest 2025, with the song "The Soul of My Soul". They were drawn to compete in the first semi-final, and were announced as one of the eight qualifiers in the semi-final. In the final, they performed 15th in the running order. They scored 33 points from the jury, placing seventh, and 69 points from televoting, placing second. With a combined total of 102 points, they finished in fourth place.

On 3 December 2025, HRT announced that Lelek was chosen to compete in Dora 2026, the Croatian national final for Eurovision Song Contest 2026, with the song "Andromeda". They performed in the first semi-final on 12 February 2026 and qualified for the grand final, which was held on 15 February. With a combined total of 173 points, they ultimately won the contest and the Croatian spot for the Eurovision Song Contest 2026. On 12 May 2026, they participated in the first semi-final in which they qualified for the final on 16 May. They placed 15th with 124 points.

== Members ==
=== Current members ===
- Inka Večerina Perušić (2024, since 2025)
- Judita Štorga (since 2024)
- Korina Olivia Rogić (since 2024)
- Lara Brtan (since 2024)
- Marina Ramljak (since 2024)

=== Former members ===
- Klaudija Pulek (2024–2025)
- Sara Jurički (2024)

== Discography ==
=== Singles ===
==== As lead artist ====
Title	Year	Peak chart positions		Album
Title	Year	CRO Dom. Air.	CRO Billb.	Album
"Tanani Nani"	2024	—	—	Non-album singles
"The Soul of my Soul"	2025	—	—	Non-album singles
"Zašto mi otimaš dom"	2025	—	—	Non-album singles
"Tane" (with Marin)	2025	—	—	Non-album singles
"Andromeda"	2026	1	12	Non-album singles
"Syenke" (with Go_A and Nazar & Qobzar)	2026	—	—	Non-album singles
"Ruke moje majke"	2026	—	—	Non-album singles
"—" denotes a recording that did not chart or was not released in that territory.

==== As featured artist ====
Title	Year	Peak chart positions	Album
Title	Year	CRO Dom. Air.	Album
"Pristajem" (Matija Cvek featuring Lelek)	2025	4	Non-album single

=== Other charted songs ===
Title	Year	Peak chart positions	Album
Title	Year	UKR Air.	Album
"Syenke (Liniorr Remix)" (with Go_A and Nazar & Qobzar feat. Liniorr)	2026	72	Non-album song

Achievements
Preceded by Marko Bošnjak with "Poison Cake"	Croatia in the Eurovision Song Contest; 2026	Succeeded by TBA
