= Pinkove Zvezdice =

Serbian TV show

Pinkove Zvezdice (Serbian for Pink Stars) was a Serbian junior singing contest for children under 15 years of age broadcast on the RTV Pink television channel. The first episode was broadcast in September 2014. Since October 22, 2023, the show has been on a hiatus due to political pressures in the country and later a backdrop of student protests since 2024.
