= Croatia in the Eurovision Song Contest 2025 =

- Eurovision Song Contest 2025
- Participating broadcaster: Croatian Radiotelevision (HRT)
- Country: Croatia
- Selection process: Dora 2025
- Selection date: 2 March 2025

Competing entry
- Song: "Poison Cake"
- Artist: Marko Bošnjak
- Songwriters: Bas Wissink; Ben Pyne; Emma Gale; Filip Majdak; Marko Bošnjak

Placement
- Semi-final result: Failed to qualify (12th)

Participation chronology

Croatia was represented at the Eurovision Song Contest 2025 with the song "Poison Cake", written by Bas Wissink, Ben Pyne, Emma Gale, Filip Majdak and Marko Bošnjak, and performed by Bošnjak himself. The Croatian participating broadcaster, Croatian Radiotelevision (HRT), organised the national final Dora 2025 in order to select its entry for the contest.

Croatia was drawn to compete in the first semi-final, which took place on 13 May 2025 and was later selected to perform in position 14. At the end of the show, Croatia was announced among the top 10 entries of the first semi-final and hence failed to qualify to compete in the final. It was later revealed that Croatia placed 12th out of the 15 participating countries in the semi-final, with 28 points.

== Background ==
Prior to the 2025 contest, Croatian Radiotelevision (HRT) had participated in the Eurovision Song Contest representing Croatia 29 times since its first entry in 1993. Its best result in the contest was second, achieved in 2024 with the song "Rim Tim Tagi Dim" performed by Baby Lasagna. This was also its first top-five finish since "Marija Magdalena" by Doris Dragović in 1999. Following the introduction of semi-finals in 2004, Croatia had thus far featured in nine finals.

As part of its duties as participating broadcaster, HRT organises the selection of its entry in the Eurovision Song Contest and broadcasts the event in the country. The broadcaster confirmed its participation in the 2025 contest on 20 September 2024. Between 1993 and 2011, HRT organised the national final Dora in order to select its entry, while it opted to internally select its entry in 2012 and 2013. After missing the contest in 2014 and 2015, HRT continued the internal selection procedure between 2016 and 2018. Since 2019, it has used Dora to select its entry, a method that was continued for its 2025 participation.

== Before Eurovision ==
=== Dora 2025 ===
Dora 2025 was the twenty-sixth edition of the national selection Dora organised by HRT to select its entry for the Eurovision Song Contest 2025. The competition consisted of two semi-finals on 27 and 28 February 2025 and a final on 2 March 2025, all taking place at the Marino Cvetković Sports Hall in Opatija and hosted by Duško Čurlić and Barbara Kolar with Zlata Mück Sušec hosting segments from the green room. All shows were broadcast on HRT 1, via radio on HR 2, and online via the streaming service HRTi as well as via Dora's official YouTube channel and the broadcaster's website hrt.hr.

==== Format ====
Twelve entries performed in each semi-final, with eight qualifying for the final based on the results of a public televote. The winner of the final was determined by a 50/50 combination of votes from the public and a jury composed of four national panels – Osijek, Rijeka, Split and Zagreb – and four international panels – Helsinki, Ljubljana, Madrid and Yerevan; each of these panels consisted of three music industry professionals. The viewers and the juries each had a total of 464 points to award. Each jury group distributed their points following the same pattern used in the Eurovision Song Contest, i.e. 1–8, 10 and 12 points. The viewer vote was based on the percentage of votes each song achieved through telephone and SMS voting; for example, if a song gained 10% of the viewer vote, then that entry would be awarded 10% of 464 points rounded to the nearest integer: 46 points.

==== Competing entries ====
On 20 September 2024, HRT opened a submission period where artists and composers were able to submit their entries to the broadcaster with the deadline on 15 November 2024. 221 entries were received by the broadcaster during the submission period, a new record since Dora was relaunched in 2019. A seven-member expert committee consisting of Željen Klašterka (musician and composer), Tihomir Preradović (composer and music producer), Monika Lelas (radio host and editor), Ivan Pešut (musician, music producer, composer and guitarist), Jelena Balent (music editor and singer), Davor Medaković (music editor) and Luka Grgić (stage director) reviewed the received submissions and selected twenty-four artists and songs as well as four backup entries for the competition. HRT announced the competing entries on 5 December 2024 and among the competing artists were Magazin, who represented Croatia in 1995, and Marko Škugor, who represented Croatia in 2013 as a member of Klapa s Mora.

On 24 December 2024, HRT announced that Lara feat. LSQ had withdrawn from the contest, and that they would be replaced by Swingers. On 7 January 2025, HRT announced that Natalie Balmix was disqualified due to submitting a finalised version of her entry that was "more than 50 percent musically and lyrically changed", and that she would be replaced by Fenksta.

Entry withdrawn/disqualified Replacement entry

Dora 2025 contestants
Artist	Song	Songwriter(s)
Ananda	"Lies Lay Cold"	Ananda Đuranović; Andreas Björkman; Jonas Ekdahl
EoT	"Bye Bye Bye"	Boris Kolarić; Goran Glavač; Maja Kolarić
Fenksta	"Extra"	Bill Cole; Saša Stević
Filomena	"Strong"	Filomena Puljiz; Domagoj Perišić
Irma	"Enigma"	Ananda Đuranović; Andreas Björkman
Ivxn	"Monopol"	Ananda Đuranović; Ivan Milić; Andreas Björkman; Jonas Ekdahl
Jelena Radan	"Salut!"	Anita Valo; Matej Zec; Meri Jaman; Robster Martin
~~Lara feat. LSQ~~	~~"Mama"~~	Miroslav Lesić; Lea Dekleva
Laurakojapjeva	"NPC"	Laura Sučec; Matej Magdić
Lelek	"The Soul of My Soul"	Filip Lacković; Tomislav Roso
Luka Nižetić	"Južina"	Luka Nižetić
Magazin	"AaAaA"	Ivan Huljić; Tonči Huljić
Marin Jurić Čivro	"Gorjelo je"	Ivan Dečak
Marko Bošnjak	"Poison Cake"	Bas Wissink; Ben Pyne; Emma Gale; Filip Majdak; Marko Bošnjak
Marko Škugor	"Šta da Boga molim ja"	Hrvoje Domazet; Marko Škugor
Marko Tolja	"Through the Dark"	Ivan Popeskić; Marko Tolja; Mia Dimšić
Martha May	"Running to the Light"	Cormac Todd; Marta Ivić; Matteo Depares
Matt Shaft	"Welcome to the Circus"	Laura Sučec; Matej Magdić
~~Natalie Balmix~~	~~"Život ide dalje"~~	Darko Dimitrov; Natali Rajković; Aida Baraku
Natalli	"Dom si srcu mom"	Alka Vuica; Hrvoje Domazet; Marija Mirković
Nipplepeople	"Znak"	Nipplepeople
Ogenj	"Daj, daj"	Andrija Bricelj; Benjamin Fabić; Leonardo Ivačić; Neven Žnidar; Petar Šimčić; Tomislav Mihac Kovačic
Petar Brkljačić	"Kraj"	Hrvoje Domazet; Ivona Zgrabljić; Petar Brkljačić
Supersonic Trio	"Animal"	Leo Anđelković; Luka Banić; Mario Huljev
Swingers	"Ful kul (Full Cool)"	Robert Mareković; Swingers
Teenah	"Aurora"	Charlie Mason; Linda Persson; Siniša Reljić; Valentina Gyerek; Ylva Persson; Silvia Steiner

Backup entries
#	Artist	Song	Songwriter(s)
1	~~Swingers~~	~~"Ful kul"~~	Robert Mareković; Swingers
2	~~Fenksta~~	~~"Extra"~~	Bill Cole; Saša Stević
3	Patricia Gasparini	"Karma"	Đivo Bjelančić; Ervin Bešić; Patricia Gašparini
4	llyricum	"Tananai"	Aleksandar Valenčić; Andrej Babić; Davor Lovrinić

==== Semi-finals ====
The two semi-finals took place on 27 and 28 February 2025. The eight qualifiers for the final from each semi-final were determined exclusively by a public televote. In addition to the performances of the competing entries, Nina Badrić, who represented Croatia in 2012, performed as an interval act during the first semi-final, while Alessandra Mele, who represented Norway in 2023, performed as an interval act during the second semi-final.

Semi-final 1 – 27 February 2025
R/O	Artist	Song	Televote			Place
R/O	Artist	Song	Phone	SMS	Total	Place
1	Matt Shaft	"Welcome to the Circus"	2,876	2,602	5,478	5
2	Jelena Radan	"Salut"	1,508	768	2,276	10
3	Nipplepeople	"Znak"	2,127	2,432	4,559	6
4	Swingers	"Ful kul"	1,093	507	1,600	11
5	Martha May	"Running to the Light"	1,203	341	1,544	12
6	Lelek	"The Soul of My Soul"	2,842	2,752	5,594	4
7	Teenah	"Aurora"	1,576	889	2,465	9
8	Ivxn	"Monopol"	2,043	1,850	3,893	7
9	Marko Tolja	"Through the Dark"	4,197	1,673	5,870	2
10	Magazin	"AaAaA"	4,349	2,111	6,460	1
11	Natalli	"Dom si srcu mom"	1,725	787	2,512	8
12	EoT	"Bye Bye Bye"	2,723	2,903	5,626	3

Semi-final 2 – 28 February 2025
R/O	Artist	Song	Televote			Place
R/O	Artist	Song	Phone	SMS	Total	Place
1	Laurakojapjeva	"NPC"	2,188	1,732	3,920	5
2	Marko Škugor	"Šta da Boga molim ja"	2,986	1,023	4,009	4
3	Fenksta	"Extra"	1,738	1,942	3,680	6
4	Marin Jurić Čivro	"Gorjelo je"	1,441	634	2,075	12
5	Filomena	"Strong"	1,916	770	2,686	7
6	Supersonic Trio	"Animal"	1,272	1,064	2,336	10
7	Irma	"Enigma"	1,417	915	2,332	11
8	Luka Nižetić	"Južina"	3,512	2,204	5,716	3
9	Ananda	"Lies Lay Cold"	1,531	918	2,449	9
10	Marko Bošnjak	"Poison Cake"	3,487	2,932	6,419	2
11	Petar Brkljačić	"Kraj"	1,751	895	2,646	8
12	Ogenj	"Daj, daj"	6,798	7,314	14,112	1

==== Final ====
The final took place on 2 March 2025 and featured the 16 qualifiers from the preceding two semi-finals. The winner, "Poison Cake" performed by Marko Bošnjak, was decided by a combination of votes from a professional jury and the Croatian public via televoting.

Final – 2 March 2025
R/O	Artist	Song	Jury	Televote				Total	Place
R/O	Artist	Song	Jury	Phone	SMS	Total	Points	Total	Place
1	EoT	"Bye Bye Bye"	30	4,488	4,844	9,332	21	51	8
2	Natalli	"Dom si srcu mom"	2	2,549	987	3,536	8	10	15
3	Ivxn	"Monopol"	19	2,470	2,610	5,080	11	30	10
4	Filomena	"Strong"	0	2,549	1,480	4,029	9	9	16
5	Fenksta	"Extra"	16	2,924	3,672	6,596	15	31	9
6	Laurakojapjeva	"NPC"	12	3,519	3,626	7,145	16	28	12
7	Nipplepeople	"Znak"	52	3,738	4,843	8,581	19	71	7
8	Ogenj	"Daj, daj"	42	15,071	19,990	35,061	78	120	2
9	Petar Brkljačić	"Kraj"	14	2,071	1,392	3,463	8	22	14
10	Matt Shaft	"Welcome to the Circus"	2	5,069	6,537	11,606	26	28	11
11	Marko Škugor	"Šta da Boga molim ja"	10	5,241	2,289	7,530	17	27	13
12	Magazin	"AaAaA"	62	14,339	7,607	21,946	49	111	3
13	Marko Bošnjak	"Poison Cake"	83	8,537	12,633	21,170	47	130	1
14	Marko Tolja	"Through the Dark"	42	9,492	4,714	14,206	32	74	6
15	Lelek	"The Soul of My Soul"	33	12,299	18,424	30,723	69	102	4
16	Luka Nižetić	"Južina"	45	8,925	8,388	17,313	39	84	5

Detailed jury votes
R/O	Song	Ljubljana	Rijeka	Madrid	Split	Yerevan	Osijek	Helsinki	Zagreb	Total
1	"Bye Bye Bye"	4		6	6	5	5		4	30
2	"Dom si srcu mom"					1			1	2
3	"Monopol"		1			12	1	5		19
4	"Strong"									0
5	"Extra"	8	7	1						16
6	"NPC"		2	3	3		3	1		12
7	"Znak"	7	5	7	4	6	8	10	5	52
8	"Daj, daj"	10	3		7	4	6	6	6	42
9	"Kraj"	1				3		8	2	14
10	"Welcome to the Circus"				2					2
11	"Šta da Boga molim ja"	3		2	1			4		10
12	"AaAaA"	2	4	10	12	8	7	7	12	62
13	"Poison Cake"	12	10	12	8	10	12	12	7	83
14	"Through the Dark"	5	12	8	5		2	2	8	42
15	"The Soul of My Soul"	6	8	5		7	4		3	33
16	"Južina"		6	4	10	2	10	3	10	45

Members of the Jury
Jury	Members
(Slovenia) Ljubljana	Aleksander Radić; Filip Vidušin; Lea Sirk
(Croatia) Rijeka	Albert Petrović; Mia Negovetić; Tina Vukov
(Spain) Madrid	César Vallejo; Alberto Jiménez; Irene Mahía
(Croatia) Split	Eduard Gracin; Antonia Dora Pleško; Vinko Didović
(Armenia) Yerevan	David Tserunyan; Anushik Ter-Ghukasyan; Arthur Manukyan
(Croatia) Osijek	Marina Ban; Zvonimir Husnjak; Dora Vestić
(Finland) Helsinki	Jaakko Oleander-Turja; Eva Frantz; Juulia Haverinen
(Croatia) Zagreb	Đurđica Ivanković; Bojan Šalamon Shalla; Antonela Đinđić

== At Eurovision ==
The Eurovision Song Contest 2025 took place at the St. Jakobshalle in Basel, Switzerland, and consisted of two semi-finals held on the respective dates of 13 and 15 May and the final on 17 May 2025. All nations with the exceptions of the host country and the "Big Five" (France, Germany, Italy, Spain and the United Kingdom) were required to qualify from one of two semi-finals in order to compete in the final; the top ten countries from each semi-final progressed to the final. On 28 January 2025, an allocation draw was held to determine which of the two semi-finals, as well as which half of the show, each country would perform in; the EBU split up the competing countries into different pots based on voting patterns from previous contests, with countries with favourable voting histories put into the same pot. Croatia was scheduled for the second half of the first semi-final. The shows' producers then decided the running order for the semi-finals; Croatia was set to perform in position 14.

In Croatia, all shows were broadcast on HRT 1 and HR 2.

=== Semi-final ===
Croatia performed in position 14, following the entry from Netherlands and before the entry from the Cyprus. At the end of the show, the country was not announced among the top 10 entries in the semi-final and therefore failed to qualify to compete in the final.

=== Voting ===
==== Points awarded to Croatia ====
Points awarded to Croatia (Semi-final 1)
Points	Televote
12 points	Slovenia
10 points	
8 points	Ukraine
7 points	
6 points	
5 points	
4 points	
3 points	
2 points	Poland; Rest of the World; San Marino (Note: San Marino uses a jury in the semi-finals.)
1 point	Netherlands; Sweden

==== Points awarded by Croatia ====
Points awarded by Croatia (Semi-final 1)
Points	Televote
12 points	Estonia
10 points	Albania
8 points	Sweden
7 points	Iceland
6 points	Slovenia
5 points	Norway
4 points	Ukraine
3 points	Netherlands
2 points	San Marino
1 point	Poland

Points awarded by Croatia (Final)
Points	Televote	Jury
12 points	Estonia	Italy
10 points	Albania	Austria
8 points	Sweden	Switzerland
7 points	Finland	Latvia
6 points	Italy	Israel
5 points	Austria	Estonia
4 points	Norway	Greece
3 points	Germany	Sweden
2 points	Ukraine	Ukraine
1 point	Iceland	Norway

==== Detailed voting by Croatia ====
The members of the Croatian jury were:

- Miroslav Lesić
- Tihomir Preradović
- Antonela Doko
- Mia Negovetić
- Monika Lelas Halambek

Detailed voting results from Croatia (Semi-final 1)
R/O	Country	Televote	
R/O	Country	Rank	Points
01	Iceland	4	7
02	Poland	10	1
03	Slovenia	5	6
04	Estonia	1	12
05	Ukraine	7	4
06	Sweden	3	8
07	Portugal	12	
08	Norway	6	5
09	Belgium	13	
10	Azerbaijan	14	
11	San Marino	9	2
12	Albania	2	10
13	Netherlands	8	3
14	Croatia		
15	Cyprus	11	

Detailed voting results by Croatia (Final)
R/O	Country	Jury							Televote	
R/O	Country	Juror A	Juror B	Juror C	Juror D	Juror E	Rank	Points	Rank	Points
01	Norway	9	16	19	15	4	10	1	7	4
02	Luxembourg	22	23	18	19	15	22		22	
03	Estonia	7	6	2	2	17	6	5	1	12
04	Israel	5	10	4	4	3	5	6	12	
05	Lithuania	18	24	23	18	14	21		14	
06	Spain	17	15	9	8	13	11		19	
07	Ukraine	11	17	6	9	8	9	2	9	2
08	United Kingdom	19	22	20	17	19	23		24	
09	Austria	2	1	5	6	2	2	10	6	5
10	Iceland	20	18	25	16	26	24		10	1
11	Latvia	4	4	7	1	20	4	7	17	
12	Netherlands	13	11	15	14	22	17		11	
13	Finland	21	19	21	12	5	12		4	7
14	Italy	1	2	1	5	1	1	12	5	6
15	Poland	12	21	24	21	9	18		13	
16	Germany	24	8	12	24	21	15		8	3
17	Greece	6	5	14	10	7	7	4	15	
18	Armenia	14	12	16	23	11	16		23	
19	Switzerland	3	3	3	3	6	3	8	21	
20	Malta	23	20	22	26	16	25		18	
21	Portugal	10	13	11	11	23	13		25	
22	Denmark	16	25	17	20	10	20		26	
23	Sweden	8	7	8	7	18	8	3	3	8
24	France	15	14	10	13	12	14		16	
25	San Marino	26	26	26	25	25	26		20	
26	Albania	25	9	13	22	24	19		2	10
