= Live at the 12 Bar: An Authorised Bootleg =

Live album by Bert Jansch
- Released: August 1996
- Recorded: 1995
- Venue: 12 Bar Club, Denmark Street, London
- Genre: Folk
- Label: Jansch; Earth Recordings (2015 reissue)

Bert Jansch chronology
When The Circus Comes To Town (1995)	Live at the 12 Bar: An Authorised Bootleg (1996)	Toy Balloon (1998)

Professional ratings
Review scores
Source	Rating
AllMusic	3/5 stars
The Encyclopedia of Popular Music	4/5 stars
Uncut	8/10

Live at the 12 Bar: An Authorised Bootleg is a straight-to-DAT concert recording by Scottish folk musician Bert Jansch released in August 1996. The concert was recorded at the 12 Bar Club, Denmark Street, London in 1995. The CD was originally available in a supposedly limited edition at gigs, in a dark blue and black sleeve, the Jansch Records version was subsequently repressed and distributed by Cooking Vinyl (to whom Bert was actually contracted at the time), though it never appeared as an official Cooking Vinyl release. Some later pressings used the same artwork but with black and white replacing blue and black.

On 25 March 2015, Earth Recordings reissued the album (titled Live at the 12 Bar, with new sleeve art by Kyle Lonsdale) in digital, CD, and vinyl formats.

== Track listing ==
All tracks composed by Bert Jansch; except where indicated

1. "Summer Heat" - 4:21
2. "Curragh of Kildare" (Traditional) - 3:57
3. "Walk Quietly By" - 2:58
4. "Come Back Baby" (Walter Davis) - 2:54
5. "Blackwaterside" (Traditional) - 4:19
6. "Fresh as a Sweet Sunday Morning" - 3:11
7. "Morning Brings Peace of Mind" - 3:09
8. "The Lily of the West" (Traditional) - 4:18
9. "Kingfisher" - 2:40
10. "Trouble in Mind" (Richard M. Jones) - 2:54
11. "Just a Dream" - 3:18
12. "Blues Run the Game" (Jackson C. Frank) - 3:20
13. "Let Me Sing" - 3:22
14. "Strolling Down the Highway" - 3:01
15. "A Woman Like You" - 3:56
16. "Bett's Dance" - 2:34

== Personnel ==
- Bert Jansch - guitar, vocals
