= Toy Balloon (album) =

Studio album by Bert Jansch
- Released: 30 March 1998
- Recorded: Castlekirk, Lochranza and Boundary Row Studios, London
- Genre: Folk
- Label: Cooking Vinyl
- Producer: Jay Burnett & Laura B

Bert Jansch chronology
Live at the 12 Bar: An Authorised Bootleg (1996)	Toy Balloon (1998)	Crimson Moon (2000)

Professional ratings
Review scores
Source	Rating
Allmusic	3.5/5 stars

Toy Balloon is the 20th album by Scottish folk musician Bert Jansch released in 1998.

== Track listing ==
All tracks composed by Bert Jansch; except where indicated

1. "Carnival" (Jackson C. Frank, Jansch) - 4:25
2. "She Moved Through the Fair" (Traditional) - 4:55
3. "All I Got" - 3:16
4. "Bett's Dance" - 2:46
5. "Toy Balloon (for Little Anna-Rebecca)" - 3:32
6. "Waitin' & Wonderin'" - 4:14
7. "Hey Doc" - 2:45
8. "Sweet Talking Lady" - 3:58
9. "Paper Houses" - 3:01
10. "Born and Bred in Old Ireland" - 3:10
11. "How It All Came Down" - 4:40
12. "Just a Simple Soul" - 3:54

== Personnel ==
- Bert Jansch - guitar, vocals
- Marcus Cliffe - bass
- Pick Withers - drums
- Johnny Hodge - slide guitar, harmonica
- Jay Burnett - keyboards
- Pee Wee Ellis - saxophone
- B. J. Cole - pedal steel
- Janie Romer - backing vocal
- Laura B - effects
