= Major Lingo =

American band

Major Lingo was a band from Jerome, Arizona, founded in 1982, and lasting 30 years until its retirement in December, 2012. Band members as of the band's retirement included original members Tony Bruno on slide guitar and John Ziegler on rhythm guitar and vocals; and more recent additions Sally Stricker on bass and vocals, and Steve Botterweg on drums and vocals. Alumni include drummer Tim Alexander, who went on to join Primus and Blue Man Group, bass player Darryl Icard, who has also played with the Gin Blossoms side project Low/Watts, bass player Linda Cushma of international band Oxygene8, vocalist Christine Thomas, original drummer Dave Rentz of New Mexico's The Withdrawals, and original bass player Teddy Rocha.

== History ==
=== Early years ===
Major Lingo was formed in 1982, when John Ziegler met Tony Bruno at the Spirit Room in Jerome, Arizona. The two were joined by Dave Rentz on drums and Teddy Rocha on bass, and began to play shows in the Verde Valley and elsewhere in the state.

By 1985, Rocha and Rentz had been replaced by Sally Stricker on bass and vocals, and Tim Alexander on drums. This lineup recorded 3 studio albums in the next three years, 1985's Major Lingo and Beats for Heads and Feet, and 1987's Ride. All were released on cassette only. After Ride, Stricker left the band, to be replaced by Linda Cushma.

=== San Francisco ===
In late 1988 or early 1989, Major Lingo moved to San Francisco, where they remained for a year. While there, they recorded a live album at the Starry Plough entitled Wild Blue Yonder, which was released in 1989. By early 1990, Major Lingo returned to Arizona, leaving behind Tim Alexander, who decided to remain in the Bay Area and soon thereafter joined Primus.

=== 1990–1995 ===
The period 1990–1995 saw much turnover among Major Lingo's lineup. Tony Bruno and John Ziegler remained constants, but Sally Stricker left the band again, to be replaced on vocals by Christine Thomas. Doug Williams took over on bass, and was soon in turn replaced by Darryl Icard, while Steve Botterweg joined on drums. By 1993, Stricker had returned for her third stint in the band, replacing Thomas, and the band recorded the EP All Through My Body, which was their first release to be issued on CD. In June 1995, Icard left the band, and after a summerlong songwriting hiatus, Stricker once again took over bass duties.

=== 1995–2012 ===
From 1995 until their retirement, the lineup for Major Lingo remained stable, with Bruno on slide, Ziegler on vocals and guitar, Stricker on vocals and bass, and Botterweg on drums and vocals. In 2000, the band released Pagan Moon, their first album in seven years. In 2002, they celebrated their 20th anniversary with a show in Jerome's Spook Hall, which featured most of the former members of the band joining the current lineup in various configurations, and saw the release of their odds-and-ends album Lost and Found. In 2007, they did the same with their 25th anniversary show, which featured 10 of the 11 past and current members of the band, and saw the release of their live CD Arizona Highway Band.

=== 2012 Retirement ===
In August 2012, Major Lingo announced via their webpage that they would be retiring at the end of the year, after 30 years as a band:

Friends, fans, family - there is barely a distinction: For Lingo these three words have come to mean one and the same. Yet, the time has come. After 30 years of adventures in song, dance, and love, we're calling it a day.

You've had a magical, profound effect on our lives; you've promoted our growth as song writers and performers by embracing all we have had to offer, and, yes, your generosity helped keep the Lingo van on the highways & put food on our tables. Above all, your movement and release fed our souls like nothing could ever achieve.

Instead of one extravagant, big send-off, our scheduled gigs will be our farewell. Let's call it our Fall Finale. We hope to see you there, if not in body, then in spirit.

Blessings & salutations. May we always hear, see and feel the music.

With love,

Sally, Tony, Steve and John

Major Lingo played their final show at Spook Hall in Jerome, AZ, on December 22, 2012, before a packed house.

That's not all. 40th anniversary in 2022.

== Sound ==
Major Lingo has an unusually eclectic sound. As the Verde News describes it:

The Lingo sound is a mixed bag of country, blues, rock, reggae, Celtic, Caribbean Calypso and South America Salsa. There are African rhythms, Japanese motifs, Scottish folk ballads and raucous New Jersey roadhouse rock. It's not at all unusual to hear Major Lingo perform a Scottish Folk ballad to an African beat or add a reggae twist to a Beatles standard.:

Relix Magazine described the Lingo sound in 1988:

(A)n infectious brand of folk rock and ska with celtic influences that have been turning on a lot of folks with their long jams and extremely danceable sounds.

and 1989:

The band has quite a distinctive sound that's rather hard to categorize, but is best described as eclectic 80's rock. For the most part they have strong rhythmic elements, and most of the songs feature plenty of use of electronic effects and searing slide guitar work.

A sample tape of live and studio material proved to be highly interesting. In the traditional "Flora," they mix folky vocal sounds with pulsating rhythms and biting slide guitar work. "Walk A Free Man," is another rhythmic cut that again features some innovative slide work and an infectious beat. In fact, it reminds me a bit of Big Country.

A 2011 article in The AZ Edge describes Major Lingo's sound:

A typical Lingo concert could include a mixed bag of country and blues, rock and roll, Irish jigs and Scottish folk, reggae and ska, and African and Caribbean music. Regardless of the band's playlist, which they make up while on stage, they guarantee to suck the audience out of their seats and spit them out on the dance floor.

And mentions the importance of Tony Bruno's slide to their sound:

Although the band plays an eclectic lineup of original and cover songs, which Ziegler said they "rehearse on stage," he and Botterweg agree that it is Bruno's lap steel guitar that gives the band its signature sound.

"He can sound like Hendrix, or like he's playing bagpipes or a sitar," Botterweg said.

"He's probably the best slide guitar player that no one has ever heard of," Ziegler added. "He's always been the 'major' in Major Lingo."

== Discography ==
=== Major Lingo ===
- Major Lingo (1985)
- Beat for Heads and Feet (1985)
- Ride (1987)
- Wild Blue Yonder (1989)
- All Through My Body (1993)
- Pagan Moon (2000)
- Lost and Found (2002)
- Arizona Highway Band (2007)

=== Tony Bruno ===
- Flinch (1998)
- Numbat (1999)
- The Shanghai Chicken Thief (2001)

=== John Ziegler and Dave Rentz ===
- One by One (2001)

=== Johnny Lingo Trio ===
- Spirit Room Spirit (2008)
