= Curtis Eller =

American musician, songwriter and banjoist

Curtis Eller's American Circus
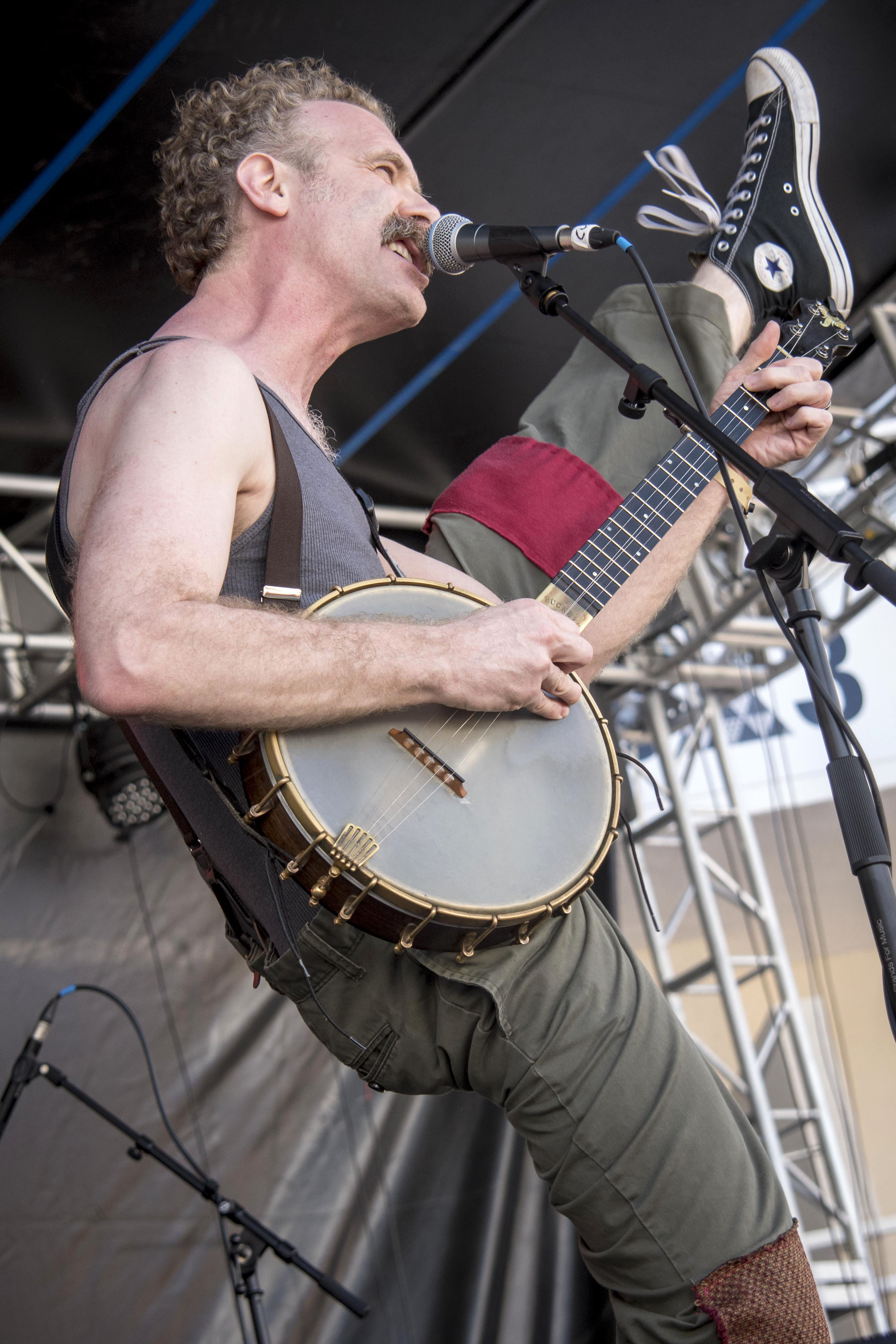

Background information
- Origin: New York, NY, United States
- Genres: Americana, alternative country, folk
- Years active: 2000–present
- Members: Curtis Eller, Hugh Crumley, Stacy Wolfson, Andy Lyth
- Website: www.curtiseller.com

Curtis Paul Eller (born 1970 in Detroit, Michigan) is an American musician, songwriter, dancer, and storyteller.

Eller's work draws on an abundance of direct or indirect influences from the first half of the 20th century, combined with a modern perspective and a healthy dose of rock & roll energy. Many of the lyrics deal with American politics both historical and contemporary. He got an early introduction to show business when his father ran the Hiller Old Tyme Circus in Detroit, Michigan.

The songwriting draws on many historical people and events but addresses contemporary American culture. Lyrical subjects have ranged from pigeon racing and performing elephants to sweatshop fires and presidential assassinations and the Hartford circus fire of 1944. Historical figures as diverse as Buster Keaton, Abraham Lincoln, Amelia Earhart, Joe Louis, Jack Ruby, Laurel and Hardy, and Elvis Presley appear in the lyrical content.

An excellent and highly intriguing singer/songwriter who is based in New York City, Curtis Eller has successfully brought a variety of influences to his unorthodox folk-rock vision. The banjo-playing Eller's work has an old-time feel, drawing on an abundance of direct or indirect influences from the '20s, '30s, and '40s (including country singer Jimmie Rodgers, cowboy icon Gene Autry, and Mississippi Delta bluesman Robert Johnson). But Eller's material is far from a carbon copy of music from that era -- there is plenty of rock bite and attitude in his rootsy work, which also contains elements of Bob Dylan, Neil Young, and the ballsy outlaw country of Johnny Cash and Merle Haggard. Eller, consciously or unconsciously, reminds listeners what Dylan, Cash, Son House, Pete Seeger, and Haggard have in common -- they are all known for being effective storytellers, and storytelling is where Eller himself shines. --Alex Hederson (Allmusic)

Eller has released seven full-length albums and several EPs and singles with his band Curtis Eller's American Circus. These releases include 1890 (2000), Banjo Music For Funerals (2002), Taking Up Serpents Again (2004), Wirewalkers & Assassins (2008), Saving my Heart for the Butcherman (2012), How to Make It in Hollywood (2014), A Poison Melody (2019), Fusebox Pennies: Collected Singles (2022) & Another Nice Mess (2024). The recordings feature Eller on banjo and lead vocals and a backing band that has varied over the years, often consisting of electric and upright bass, drums, accordion, pedal steel, tuba, violin, a horn section, and three-part harmony.

Eller frequently tours the US, UK, Europe and Canada, both as a solo act and as the leader of his band The American Circus. In addition to the usual folk, punk and indie-rock clubs, he has appeared in numerous unusual venues, including funerals, horse races, vaudeville/burlesque revues. He has shared the stage with contortionists, strippers, glass-eaters and folksingers. The live performances are high energy, intensively physical events.

In 2010, Eller relocated to Durham, NC where he continues to record and perform regularly.

In 2015 Eller started working with dancer/choreographer Stacy Wolfson to form The Bipeds. Wolfson and Eller have devised a unique compositional approach that seamlessly combines movement, music and lyrics to create a peculiar and compelling hybrid of dance and song. The Bipeds were commissioned to create a piece for the American Dance Festival's 2024 Made in NC Showcase. That piece was "We Know This By Heart" (the accompanying song appears on Eller's newest album Another Nice Mess).

== Discography ==
With The American Circus
Full Length Albums:
1890 (2000)
Taking Up Serpents Again (2004)
Wirewalkers & Assassins (2008)
1890 (2011 Remix)
How to Make It in Hollywood (2014)
A Poison Melody(2019)
Fusebox Pennies: Collected Singles (2022)
Another Nice Mess (2024)

EP/Singles:
Banjo Music For Funerals (2002)
Saving My Heart for the Butcherman (2012)
Baudelaire in a Box: Songs of Anguish (2015)
Henry Kissinger's Dance Party (2016)
This is Christmas Time (2020)
Here Comes New Year's Day (2021)

With The Bipeds
54 Strange Words (2018)
Bury the Light (2020)
We Know This By Heart (2024)
