= Outernet London =

Mixed use development in London

Coordinates: 51.5159°N 0.1300°W

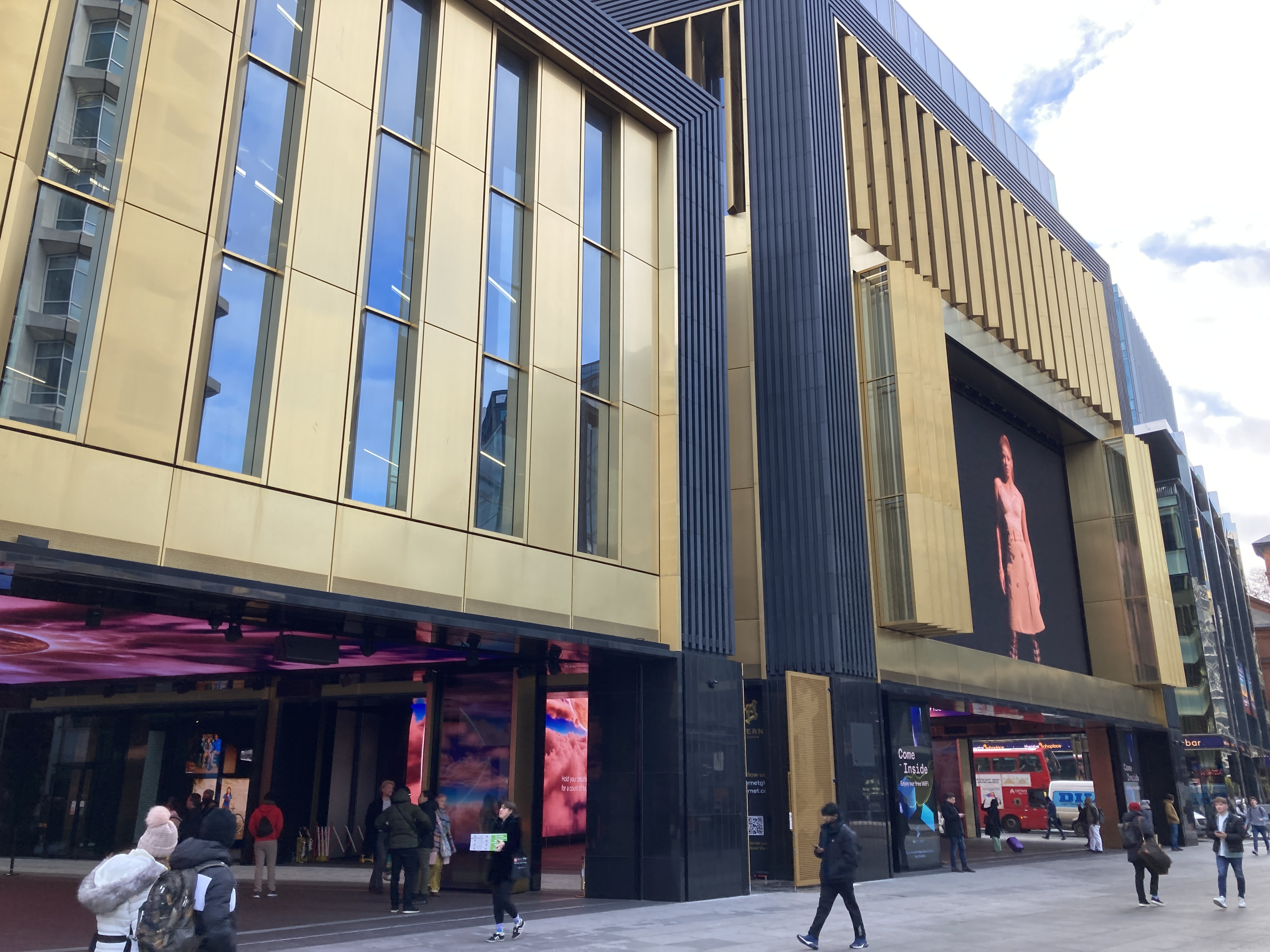

Project
- Opening date: 2022
- Developer: Consolidated Developments
- Operator: Outernet London
- Website: http://www.outernet.com

Location
- Interactive map of Outernet London
- Location: adjacent to Crossrail Tottenham Court Road/Charing Cross Road southern exit

Outernet London is a public entertainment space focused on the arts, music and culture opened in 2022 in the West End of London. In a sponsored article in The Times newspaper in 2023, it was claimed to be "London's most visited tourist attraction". It is the largest digital exhibition space in Europe with the "world's largest LED screen deployment". It is located adjacent to the eastern exit of the new Elizabeth line Tottenham Court Road Underground station, on the southern side of the public square, and it extends to Denmark Street, known as "Tin Pan Alley", with St Giles High Street to the east and Charing Cross Road to the west.

== Spaces and venues ==
The development contains:

- The Now Building – featuring four-storey-high video screens
- Now Trending – a space for immersive content or sampling
- Now Arcade – an LED tunnel
- Outernet Live – an underground 2,000-capacity music venue
- The Lower Third – a 250-capacity music venue
- Chateau Denmark – a hotel

as well as broadcasting and media facilities, bars and restaurants and pop up spaces.

Public spaces will reportedly feature a public arts programme and advertising campaigns using virtual reality, augmented reality, and artificial intelligence. News reports have indicated that entertainment will be created by Technicolor and Sir Ridley's Scott's the Ridley Scott Creative Group.

There are also residential apartments, office space and 20,000 sq ft of retail space.

== Planning and construction ==
Construction followed more than a decade of planning. The main construction contractor for the project was Skanska and the developer is Consolidated Developments. The primary architect for the project was Orms and the heritage consultant was Alan Baxter Associates. To protect against vibration from the Elizabeth and Northern line trains, special construction methods were used.

The area immediately surrounding Outernet was also recently under development from Crossrail and other projects such as the new @sohoplace theatre which both also opened in 2022. The Oxford Street shopping area has therefore undergone significant renewal.

== Reaction and comment ==
The redevelopment has been welcomed by London's Night Czar Amy Lame, but has also been controversial and criticised with many commentators lamenting the decline of live music in London and criticising the redevelopment plans, in particular their impact on Denmark Street.

Some commentators have criticised the architecture, but others believe it creates a space for music that reflects the current internet age. Outernet London have said they will preserve the area's musical legacy and support both music shops and live music. The redeveloped Denmark Street features busking points and a pro-bono recording studio in partnership with the BPI, although this has not yet come to fruition. Denmark Street appears largely unchanged with more music shops than ever and a new indie music venue called The Lower Third located on the site of the old 12 Bar Club.
