= Marcel Bezençon Awards =

Eurovision awards

- Awarded for: Best competing songs in the Eurovision Song Contest
- Country: Various participating countries
- Presented by: European Broadcasting Union (EBU)
- First award: 2002
- Website: https://www.marcelbezenconaward.com

The Marcel Bezençon Awards were first handed out during the Eurovision Song Contest 2002 in Tallinn, Estonia honouring the best competing songs in the final. Founded by Christer Björkman (Sweden's representative in the Eurovision Song Contest 1992 and Head of Delegation for Sweden until 2021) and Richard Herrey (member of Herreys, winner of the Eurovision Song Contest 1984 for Sweden), the awards are named after the creator of the annual competition, Marcel Bezençon.

Although sanctioned by the European Broadcasting Union (EBU), the awards are not presented during the Eurovision final, but rather are handed out during the official afterparty. Beginning with the 2009 contest, the trophies are handed out prior to the final.

== Categories ==
The awards are divided into 3 categories:

- 'Media Award' (Note: Named as Press Award until 2023) – Given to the best entry as voted on by the accredited media and press during the event.
- 'Artistic Award' – Presented to the best artist as voted on by the commentators since 2010. Until 2009, the category was voted on by previous winners of the contest.
- 'Composer Award' – A jury consisting of the participating composers vote for the best and most original composition.

In 2008, a special one-off award was presented, the Poplight Fan Award, as voted by fans on the Swedish website Poplight.se and presented to their favourite debuting artist under the age of 25.

== Winners ==
=== Media Award ===
Year	Country	Song	Performer	Final	Points	Host city	Ref.
2002	France	"Il faut du temps"	Sandrine François	5	104	(Estonia) Tallinn	
2003	Turkey	"Everyway That I Can"	Sertab Erener	1	167	(Latvia) Riga	
2004	Serbia and Montenegro	"Lane moje" (Лане моје)	Željko Joksimović	2	263	(Turkey) Istanbul	
2005	Malta	"Angel"	Chiara	2	192	(Ukraine) Kyiv	
2006	Finland	"Hard Rock Hallelujah"	Lordi	1	292	(Greece) Athens	
2007	Ukraine	"Dancing Lasha Tumbai"	Verka Serduchka	2	235	(Finland) Helsinki	
2008	Portugal	"Senhora do mar (Negras águas)"	Vânia Fernandes	13	69	(Serbia) Belgrade	
2009	Norway	"Fairytale"	Alexander Rybak	1	387	(Russia) Moscow	
2010	Israel	"Milim" (מילים)	Harel Skaat	14	71	(Norway) Oslo	
2011	Finland	"Da Da Dam"	Paradise Oskar	21	57	(Germany) Düsseldorf	
2012	Azerbaijan	"When the Music Dies"	Sabina Babayeva	4	150	(Azerbaijan) Baku	
2013	Georgia	"Waterfall"	Nodiko Tatishvili and Sophie Gelovani	15	50	(Sweden) Malmö	
2014	Austria	"Rise Like a Phoenix"	Conchita Wurst	1	290	(Denmark) Copenhagen	
2015	Italy	"Grande amore"	Il Volo	3	292	(Austria) Vienna	
2016	Russia	"You Are the Only One"	Sergey Lazarev	3	491	(Sweden) Stockholm	
2017	Italy	"Occidentali's Karma"	Francesco Gabbani	6	334	(Ukraine) Kyiv	
2018	France	"Mercy"	Madame Monsieur	13	173	(Portugal) Lisbon	
2019	Netherlands	"Arcade"	Duncan Laurence	1	498	(Israel) Tel Aviv	
2021	France	"Voilà"	Barbara Pravi	2	499	(Netherlands) Rotterdam	
2022	United Kingdom	"Space Man"	Sam Ryder	2	466	(Italy) Turin	
2023	Sweden	"Tattoo"	Loreen	1	583	(United Kingdom) Liverpool	
2024	Croatia	"Rim Tim Tagi Dim"	Baby Lasagna	2	547	(Sweden) Malmö	
2025	France	"Maman"	Louane	7	230	(Switzerland) Basel	
2026	Australia	"Eclipse"	Delta Goodrem	4	287	(Austria) Vienna	

=== Artistic Award ===
==== Voted by previous winners ====
Year	Country	Performer	Song	Stage director(s)	Final	Points	Host city	Ref.
2002	Sweden	Afro-dite	"Never Let It Go"		8	72	(Estonia) Tallinn	
2003	Netherlands	Esther Hart	"One More Night"		13	45	(Latvia) Riga	
2004	Ukraine	Ruslana	"Wild Dances"		1	280	(Turkey) Istanbul	
2005	Greece	Helena Paparizou	"My Number One"	Fokas Evangelinos	1	230	(Ukraine) Kyiv	
2006	Sweden	Carola	"Invincible"		5	170	(Greece) Athens	
2007	Serbia	Marija Šerifović	"Molitva" (Молитва)	Gorčin Stojanović	1	268	(Finland) Helsinki	
2008	Ukraine	Ani Lorak	"Shady Lady"	Fokas Evangelinos	2	230	(Serbia) Belgrade	
2009	France	Patricia Kaas	"Et s'il fallait le faire"		8	107	(Russia) Moscow	

==== Voted by commentators ====
Since 2010, the show commentators have replaced the previous winners as the selection jury for the winners.

Year	Country	Performer	Song	Stage director(s)	Final	Points	Host city	Ref.
2010	Israel	Harel Skaat	"Milim" (מילים)	Doron Medalie	14	71	(Norway) Oslo	
2011	Ireland	Jedward	"Lipstick"	Brian Friedman	8	119	(Germany) Düsseldorf	
2012	Sweden	Loreen	"Euphoria"	Ambra Succi	1	372	(Azerbaijan) Baku	
2013	Azerbaijan	Farid Mammadov	"Hold Me"	Fokas Evangelinos	2	234	(Sweden) Malmö	
2014	Netherlands	The Common Linnets	"Calm After the Storm"	Hans Pannecoucke	2	238	(Denmark) Copenhagen	
2015	Sweden	Måns Zelmerlöw	"Heroes"	Fredrik Rydman	1	365	(Austria) Vienna	
2016	Ukraine	Jamala	"1944"	Kostiantyn Tomilchenko and Oleksandr Bratkovskyi	1	534	(Sweden) Stockholm	
2017	Portugal	Salvador Sobral	"Amar pelos dois"	Luísa Sobral	1	758	(Ukraine) Kyiv	
2018	Cyprus	Eleni Foureira	"Fuego"	Sacha Jean-Baptiste	2	436	(Portugal) Lisbon	
2019	Australia	Kate Miller-Heidke	"Zero Gravity"	Philip Gleeson	9	285	(Israel) Tel Aviv	
2021	France	Barbara Pravi	"Voilà"	Marika Prochet	2	499	(Netherlands) Rotterdam	
2022	Serbia	Konstrakta	"In corpore sano"	Jasmin Cvišić and Miodrag Kolarić	5	312	(Italy) Turin	
2023	Sweden	Loreen	"Tattoo"	Anders Wistbacka	1	583	(United Kingdom) Liverpool	
2024	Switzerland	Nemo	"The Code"	Fredrik Rydman	1	591	(Sweden) Malmö	
2025	France	Louane	"Maman"	Fredrik Rydman	7	230	(Switzerland) Basel	
2026	Bulgaria	Dara	"Bangaranga"	Fredrik Rydman and Keisha von Arnold	1	516	(Austria) Vienna	

=== Composer Award winners ===
This award was first presented in 2004, replacing the Fan Award.

Year	Country	Song	Composer(s) Lyrics (l) / Music (m)	Performer	Final	Points	Host city	Ref.
2004	Cyprus	"Stronger Every Minute"	Mike Konnaris (m & l)	Lisa Andreas	5	170	(Turkey) Istanbul	
2005	Serbia and Montenegro	"Zauvijek moja"	Slaven Knezović (m) and Milan Perić (l)	No Name	7	137	(Ukraine) Kyiv	
2006	Bosnia and Herzegovina	"Lejla"	Željko Joksimović (m), Fahrudin Pecikoza (l) and Dejan Ivanović (l)	Hari Mata Hari	3	229	(Greece) Athens	
2007	Hungary	"Unsubstantial Blues"	Magdi Rúzsa (m) and Imre Mózsik (l)	Magdi Rúzsa	9	128	(Finland) Helsinki	
2008	Romania	"Pe-o margine de lume"	Andrei Tudor (m), Andreea Andrei (l) and Adina Șuteu (l)	Nico & Vlad	20	45	(Serbia) Belgrade	
2009	Bosnia and Herzegovina	"Bistra voda"	Aleksandar Čović (m & l)	Regina	9	106	(Russia) Moscow	
2010	Israel	"Milim" (מילים)	Tomer Hadadi (m) and Noam Horev (l)	Harel Skaat	14	71	(Norway) Oslo	
2011	France	"Sognu"	Daniel Moyne (m), Quentin Bachelet (m) and Jean-Pierre Marcellesi (l), Julie Miller (l)	Amaury Vassili	15	82	(Germany) Düsseldorf	
2012	Sweden	"Euphoria"	Thomas G:son (m & l) and Peter Boström (m & l)	Loreen	1	372	(Azerbaijan) Baku	
2013	Sweden	"You"	Robin Stjernberg (m & l), Linnea Deb (m & l), Joy Deb (m & l) and Joakim Harestad Haukaas (m & l)	Robin Stjernberg	14	62	(Sweden) Malmö	
2014	Netherlands	"Calm After the Storm"	Ilse DeLange (m & l), JB Meijers (m & l), Rob Crosby (m & l), Matthew Crosby (m & l) and Jake Etheridge (m & l)	The Common Linnets	2	238	(Denmark) Copenhagen	
2015	Norway	"A Monster Like Me"	Kjetil Mørland (m & l)	Mørland & Debrah Scarlett	8	102	(Austria) Vienna	
2016	Australia	"Sound of Silence"	Anthony Egizii (m & l) and David Musumeci (m & l)	Dami Im	2	511	(Sweden) Stockholm	
2017	Portugal	"Amar pelos dois"	Luísa Sobral (m & l)	Salvador Sobral	1	758	(Ukraine) Kyiv	
2018	Bulgaria	"Bones"	Borislav Milanov (m & l), Trey Campbell (m & l), Joacim Persson (m & l), and Dag Lundberg (m & l)	Equinox	14	166	(Portugal) Lisbon	
2019	Italy	"Soldi"	Charlie Charles (m & l), Dario "Dardust" Faini (m & l), and Alessandro Mahmoud (m & l)	Mahmood	2	472	(Israel) Tel Aviv	
2021	Switzerland	"Tout l'univers"	Gjon Muharremaj (m & l), Xavier Michel (m & l), Wouter Hardy (m & l), and Nina Sampermans (m & l)	Gjon's Tears	3	432	(Netherlands) Rotterdam	
2022	Sweden	"Hold Me Closer"	Cornelia Jakobsdotter (m & l), David Zandén (m & l), and Isa Molin (m & l)	Cornelia Jakobs	4	438	(Italy) Turin	
2023	Italy	"Due vite"	Davide Simonetta (m & l), Marco Mengoni (l) and Davide Petrella (l)	Marco Mengoni	4	350	(United Kingdom) Liverpool	
2024	Switzerland	"The Code"	Benjamin Alasu (m & l), Lasse Midtsian Nymann (m & l), Linda Dale (m & l), Nemo Mettler (m & l)	Nemo	1	591	(Sweden) Malmö	
2025	Switzerland	"Voyage"	Emily Middlemas (m & l), Tom Oehler (m & l), Zoë Më (m & l)	Zoë Më	10	214	(Switzerland) Basel	
2026	Denmark	"Før vi går hjem"	Clara Sofie Fabricius (m & l), Søren Torpegaard Lund (m & l), Thomas Meilstrup (m & l) and Valdemar Littauer Bendixen (m & l)	Søren Torpegaard Lund	7	243	(Austria) Vienna	

=== Fan Award ===
Year	Country	Song	Performer	Final	Points	Host city	Ref.
2002	Finland	"Addicted To You"	Laura Voutilainen	20	24	(Estonia) Tallinn	
2003	Spain	"Dime"	Beth	8	81	(Latvia) Riga	
2008	Armenia	"Qélé, Qélé"	Sirusho Harutyunyan	4	199	(Serbia) Belgrade	

=== Winners by country ===
Country	Total	Media Award	Artistic Award	Composer Award	Fan Award
Sweden	9	1	5	3	
France	8	4	3	1	
Italy	4	2		2	
Ukraine	4	1	3		
Netherlands	4	1	2	1	
Switzerland	4		1	3	
Portugal	3	1	1	1	
Finland	3	2			1
Israel	3	1	1	1	
Australia	3	1	1	1	
Bulgaria	2		1	1	
Cyprus	2		1	1	
Norway	2	1		1	
Azerbaijan	2	1	1		
Bosnia and Herzegovina	2			2	
Serbia and Montenegro	2	1		1	
Serbia	2		2		
Croatia	1	1			
Russia	1	1			
Austria	1	1			
Georgia	1	1			
Ireland	1		1		
Romania	1			1	
Armenia	1				1
Hungary	1			1	
Malta	1	1			
Turkey	1	1			
Greece	1		1		
Spain	1				1
United Kingdom	1	1			
Denmark	1			1	

== Melodifestivalen winners ==
Between 2005 and 2015, Sveriges Television (SVT) awarded Marcel Bezençon Awards during its national selection Melodifestivalen. These awards followed the same format as that for the Eurovision awards, with awards given to songs that competed in the final of the contest.

=== Media Award ===
Year	Performer	Song	Final	Points	Ref.
2005	Shirley Clamp	"Att älska dig"	4	130	
2006	BWO	"Temple of Love"	2	202	
2007	Sonja Aldén	"För att du finns"	6	62	
2008	Sanna Nielsen	"Empty Room"	2	206	
2009	Caroline af Ugglas	"Snälla snälla"	2	171	
2010	Anna Bergendahl	"This Is My Life"	1	214	
2011	Eric Saade	"Popular"	1	193	
2012	Loreen	"Euphoria"	1	268	
2013	Yohio	"Heartbreak Hotel"	2	133	
2014	Sanna Nielsen	"Undo"	1	212	
2015	Måns Zelmerlöw	"Heroes"	1	288	

=== Artistic Award ===
Year	Performer	Song	Stage director(s)	Final	Points	Ref.
2005	Nanne Grönvall	"Håll om mig"		2	209	
2006	Carola	"Evighet"		1	234	
2007	Sonja Aldén	"För att du finns"		6	62	
2008	BWO	"Lay Your Love on Me"		3	158	
2009	Sarah Dawn Finer	"Moving On"		6	87	
2010	Eric Saade	"Manboy"		3	155	
2011	Danny Saucedo	"In the Club"	Ambra Succi	2	149	
2012	Loreen	"Euphoria"	Ambra Succi	1	268	
2013	Yohio	"Heartbreak Hotel"	Rennie Mirro	2	133	
2014	Ace Wilder	"Busy Doin' Nothin"	Litho Nericcio	2	210	
2015	Isa	"Don't Stop"	Martin Jonsson	7	56	

=== Composer Award ===
Year	Song	Composer(s)	Performer	Final	Points	Ref.
2005	"A Different Kind of Love"	Joacim Dubbelman, Martin Landh, Sam McCarthy	Caroline Wennergren	5	116	
2006	"Sing for Me"	Andreas Johnson, Peter Kvint	Andreas Johnson	3	200	
2007	"I Remember Love"	Peter Hallström, Sarah Dawn Finer	Sarah Dawn Finer	4	122	
2008	"Empty Room"	Bobby Ljunggren, Aleena Gibson	Sanna Nielsen	2	206	
2009	"You're My World"	Emilia Rydberg, Fredrik "Figge" Boström	Emilia	9	28	
2010	"Keep on Walking"	Salem Al Fakir	Salem Al Fakir	2	183	
2011	"Leaving Home"	Jojo Borg Larsson, Nicke Borg, Fredrik Thomander, Anders "Gary" Wikström	Nicke Borg	8	57	
2012	"Why Start a Fire"	Lisa Miskovsky, Aleksander With, Bernt Rune Stray, Berent Philip Moe	Lisa Miskovsky	9	39	
2013	"You"	Robin Stjernberg, Linnea Deb, Joy Deb, Joakim Harestad Haukaas	Robin Stjernberg	1	166	
2014	"Undo"	Fredrik Kempe, David Kreuger, Hamed "K-One" Pirouzpanah	Sanna Nielsen	1	212	
2015	"Don't Stop Believing"	Miss Li, Sonny Gustafsson	Mariette Hansson	3	102	
