= Alice (Veronica Fusaro song) =

2025 song by Veronica Fusaro

Single by Veronica Fusaro

from the album Looking for Connection
- Released: 24 October 2025
- Genre: Alternative pop; indie rock; blues-rock
- Length: 3:00
- Label: Deepdive; Nettwerk
- Songwriters: Charlotte Danielle McClean; Veronica Fusaro
- Producer: Charlotte Danielle McClean

Veronica Fusaro singles chronology
"Gold Rush" (2025)	"Alice" (2025)

Music video
- "Alice" on YouTube

Eurovision Song Contest 2026 entry
- Country: Switzerland
- Artist: Veronica Fusaro
- Languages: English
- Composers: Charlotte Danielle McClean; Veronica Fusaro
- Lyricist: Charlotte Danielle McClean

Finals performance
- Semi-final result: 11th
- Semi-final points: 108

Entry chronology
- ◄ "Voyage" (2025)

Official performance video
- "Alice" (second semi-final) on YouTube

"Alice" is a song by Swiss singer-songwriter Veronica Fusaro. Exploring themes of abuse and violence against women, the track was composed by Fusaro and Charlotte Danielle McClean, and was originally released on 24 October 2025 as part of her second album, Looking for Connection. It was later released as a single on 11 March 2026 through Deepdive Records, under Nettwerk's exclusive license. The song represented Switzerland in the Eurovision Song Contest 2026, and finished 11th in the second semi-final.

Critical response to "Alice" has been generally positive to mixed, commending Fusaro's strong vocals, the track's lyrical themes, and its rock production, but music critics questioned its Eurovision suitability, arguing that a lack of a memorable hook might hinder its appeal to the voting public despite potential support from professional juries.

"Alice" reached number 94 on the Swiss singles chart, becoming Fusaro's first charting song in her home country.

== Background and composition ==
"Alice" was composed by Veronica Fusaro and British songwriter and producer Charlotte Danielle McClean, with the latter producing the song. The track originally appeared on Fusaro’s second studio album, Looking for Connection, released on 24 October 2025. Following its selection for Eurovision, the track underwent a reproduction process to create the "ESC Version" which Fusaro described as "a little bigger" and "more confident" than the original album cut.

Lyrically, the song addresses themes of physical and psychological violence and abuse, as well as erosion of personal boundaries. "Alice" refers to a woman who never gets a chance to speak and completely becomes the object of the other person. The song title stresses "how easily a person's voice can be taken away". Fusaro intended for the song to highlight forms of violence that are often disguised as affection, stating that the character "becomes completely objectified by the person in front of her".

In addition, "Alice" is musically described as an "alternative pop track with rock influences", composed with a 6/8 time signature. The song starts with a "light waltz-like rhythm", which quickly gives way to heavier rock textures, reflecting the tension of the story.

== Release and music video ==
The song was officially released as a single on 11 March 2026 through Deepdive Records, under the exclusive license of Nettwerk. The music video, directed by Ruy Okamura and filmed in Lucerne, was simultaneously released on the official YouTube channel of the Eurovision Song Contest. The song's themes are reflected in the music video, which featured a wedding ceremony, serving as a "narrative framework for a game between observation and obsession". Throughout the ceremony, the bride was subjected to the actions of her controlling husband, until she was struck in the face with a slice of cake when it arrived. The music video ended with a scene between the bride and Fusaro at the lake, hugging each other, to which the latter suggested as having a "queer undertone".

== Promotion ==
To promote "Alice" before the Eurovision Song Contest 2026, Fusaro announced her intent to participate in various Eurovision pre-parties. She participated at the Nordic Eurovision 2026 which was held at Rockefeller in Oslo on 21 March 2026. She also performed at the London Eurovision Party 2026 held at Here at Outernet on 19 April 2026. Prior to the latter pre-party, she gave her first television performance of the song on the entertainment program Happy Day on 11 April 2026.

== Critical reception ==
=== Swiss media and personalities ===
"Alice" was met with mixed reviews from Swiss music critics. In a review for Corriere del Ticino, Mauro Rossi praised the song's "excellent indie rock" sound, stating it was "neither banal nor predictable" despite its radio-friendly aims. While he lauded Fusaro’s "consummate confidence", he expressed concerns regarding the song's chances in Eurovision, noting that it might be "too busy for the standards of the event". Ane Hebeisen of Tages-Anzeiger praised Fusaro’s vocal performance and songwriting craftsmanship, but found that the song lacked a memorable melody or genuine emotional urgency, describing it as having "harmonic progression reminiscent of 60s heartbreak ballads, yet it cleverly breaks free from this pattern time and again". He compared the track's impact to that of a routine television crime drama, suggesting that as soon as the song builds up, it then disappears "without a melody or any urgent emotion lingering in the short-term memory". Hebeisen also expressed doubt regarding the entry's Eurovision chances, noting that rock-influenced songs from Switzerland have historically struggled in the competition.

Writing for Bote der Urschweiz, Michael Graber noted the effective pairing of Fusaro’s vocals with the song's rock arrangement, but he argued that the track lacked the energy and distinctiveness required for the contest. However, he suggested that they are always at their best when they are "not on everyone's radar". In Watson, Nadine Sommerhalder characterised the track as a solid and well-produced radio song and called Fusaro's vocals "convincing", but found it too "predictable" for the competition and that the song fell significantly short compared to the entries Switzerland has sent to the contest in recent years. While she suggested the song's craftsmanship might appeal to professional juries, she believed its lack of a "surprise" factor would make qualifying for the final a challenge. Similarly, Niels Bossert of Neue Zürcher Zeitung wrote that despite the song's compelling theme and Fusaro's "powerful vocals", the chorus does not "burrow deeply enough to be truly memorable" and found the song "too tame". He further noted that the "thematically strong" entry might find more favour with professional juries than with the general public during the semi-finals.

=== Eurovision-related and international media ===
International critics offered positive reviews on "Alice". In the Dutch newspaper de Volkskrant, Robert van Gijssel and Els de Grefte dubbed the song as one of the 10 best Eurovision songs of 2026, praising Fusaro's vocals by calling it "beautiful" and "raw enough" to convincingly deliver the song's message and that she can "deliver the high notes without losing her coolness", albeit noting that the guitar solo is "quite cliché". Eva Frantz of Yle gave the song a rating of nine out of 10, praising its "old school rock sound" and Fusaro's "pleasant voice", but acknowledged that the entry is "not everyone's cup of tea".

Jon O'Brien from Vulture ranked the entry fourth out of the 35 entries, describing it as a "well-crafted" but "sobering meditation" on domestic violence that lacked the qualities of a typical crowd-pleaser. While he predicted the song might struggle to gain public support in a similar nature as "Voyage" by Zoë Më, he suggested that Fusaro may be the "contestant with the brightest future". In the Norwegian newspaper Dagbladet, Ralf Lofstad gave the song a four out of six, calling it "quite atmospheric and rock club-like" and likening it to "Stop!" by Sam Brown and "Lose Control" by Teddy Swims. While he applauded Fusaro's vocals, he expressed doubts about the track's lasting appeal.

== Eurovision Song Contest 2026 ==
=== Internal selection ===
On 2 June 2025, the Swiss Broadcasting Corporation (SRG SSR) announced its intent to participate in the Eurovision Song Contest 2026. SRG SSR later opened a submission period between 4 and 25 August 2025 for interested artists and composers to submit their entries. Artists and songwriters of any nationality were able to submit songs, with priority given to Swiss nationals or residents. At the closing of the window, 493 entries had been submitted. Submissions were assessed in various rounds by a Swiss public panel, an international public panel, and a 25-member international expert jury; the public panels consisted of Swiss and international audience members, while the international jury consisted of former national jurors for their respective countries at the Eurovision Song Contest. It was then announced on 20 January 2026 that Fusaro will represent the country in the contest, and was later revealed that she will be performing the song "Alice", with the Swiss-German newspaper Blick unofficially confirming the entry shortly before the broadcaster's announcement.

=== At Eurovision ===
The Eurovision Song Contest 2026 took place at Wiener Stadthalle in Vienna, Austria, and consisted of two semi-finals which were held on the respective dates of 12 and 14 May and the final on 16 May 2026. During the allocation draw held on 12 January 2026, Switzerland was drawn to compete in the second semi-final, performing in the first half of the show. Fusaro was later drawn to perform seventh, after Armenia's Simón and before Cyprus' Antigoni.

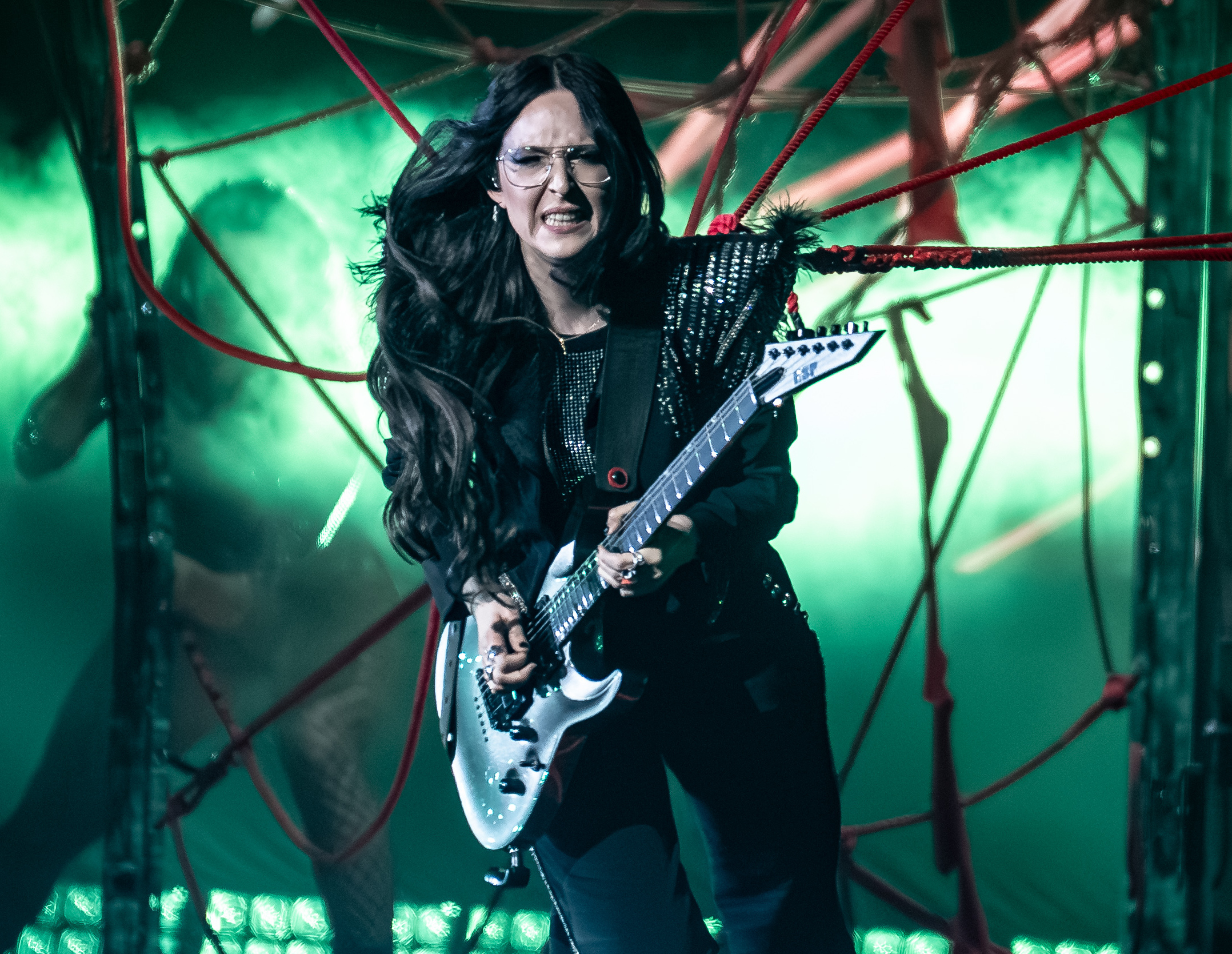
Fusaro performing "Alice" during the Eurovision 2026 second semi-final

For her Eurovision performance, the staging was directed by Fredrik Rydman. Fusaro wore a black jacket with sequins and epaulettes. The staging featured a cage of red ropes which formed a sort of spiderweb, to which is a visual metaphor of bullying. She was also accompanied by four dancers who were also "imprisoned", symbolising the relationship between victims and the system. During her performance, Fusaro began by interacting with the camera, using a microphone which is also attached to a red rope to simulate a tug-of-war with the camera operator. The backing dancers then accompanied her to the cage, to which she later broke free, before kneeling to spell out the name "Alice" using the red rope.

"Alice" finished 11th in the second semi-final, scoring 108 points with a split score of 48 points from the juries and 60 points from the public televote, failing to qualify for the grand final despite placing ninth with both voting bodies individually. Regarding the former, the song did not receive any sets of 12 points; the most a country gave was an eight from Czechia, Romania, and Ukraine. The song also did not receive any sets of 12 points from the public televote; the most a country gave was an eight, with it being awarded by Azerbaijan and Ukraine.

== Charts ==
Chart performance for "Alice"
Chart (2026)	Peak position
Switzerland (Schweizer Hitparade)	94
Switzerland Airplay (Schweizer Hitparade)	6

== Release history ==
Release dates and formats for "Alice"
Region	Date	Format(s)	Version	Label	Ref.
Various	24 October 2025	Digital download; streaming	Album track	Self-released	
Various	11 March 2026	Digital download; streaming	Eurovision version	Deepdive; Nettwerk	
Italy	11 March 2026	Radio airplay	Eurovision version	Nettwerk	
