= Switzerland in the Eurovision Song Contest 2025 =

- Eurovision Song Contest 2025
- Participating broadcaster: Swiss Broadcasting Corporation (SRG SSR)
- Country: Switzerland
- Selection process: Internal selection
- Announcement date: Artist: 5 March 2025; Song: 10 March 2025

Competing entry
- Song: "Voyage"
- Artist: Zoë Më
- Songwriters: Emily Middlemas; Tom Oehler; Zoë Anina Kressler

Placement
- Final result: 10th, 214 points

Participation chronology

Switzerland was represented at the Eurovision Song Contest 2025 with the song "Voyage", written by Emily Middlemas, Tom Oehler and Zoë Anina Kressler, and performed by Kressler herself under her stage name Zoë Më. The Swiss participating broadcaster, the Swiss Broadcasting Corporation (SRG SSR), internally selected its entry for the contest. In addition, SRG SSR was also the host broadcaster and staged the event at St. Jakobshalle in Basel, after winning the previous edition with the song "The Code" by Nemo.

As the host country, Switzerland automatically qualified to compete in the final of the Eurovision Song Contest. Performing in position 19, the country placed 10th out of the 26 performing countries with 214 points.

== Background ==
Prior to the 2025 contest, the Swiss Broadcasting Corporation (SRG SSR) had participated in the Eurovision Song Contest representing Switzerland sixty-four times since its first entry at the inaugural contest in 1956. It won that first edition of the contest with the song "Refrain" performed by Lys Assia. Its second victory was achieved in 1988 with "Ne partez pas sans moi" performed by Canadian singer Céline Dion. Switzerland won the contest for the third time in 2024, with "The Code" performed by Nemo. Since the introduction of semi-finals to the format of the contest in 2004, Switzerland has thus far managed to qualify to the final on ten occasions, five of them being all the contests it participated in since 2019, which included three top five results.

As part of its duties as participating broadcaster, SRG SSR organises the selection of its entry in the Eurovision Song Contest and broadcasts the event in the country. The broadcaster had opted for both national finals and internal selections to select its entries throughout the years, sticking to the internal selection method since 2019. SRG SSR confirmed its intention to compete in and host the 2025 contest immediately after the 2024 final, later announcing that it would again use an internal selection to determine its entry.

== Before Eurovision ==
=== SUISA songwriting camp ===
Between 27 and 29 May 2024, the annual SUISA songwriting camp took place in Maur, Zurich; the songs composed in the event are usually submitted to SRG SSR as potential Eurovision entries. Participants in the camp included Ashley Hicklin (a seven-time Eurovision entrant as a songwriter), Linda Dale (a two-time Eurovision entrant as a songwriter, including with "The Code", the winning Swiss entry in 2024) and Teya (one of the 2023 representatives for Austria).

=== Internal selection ===
SRG SSR opened a submission period between 8 and 22 August 2024 for interested artists and composers to submit their entries. Artists and songwriters of any nationality were able to submit songs, with priority given to Swiss nationals or residents. At the closing of the window, 431 entries had been submitted. The selection process was implemented in collaboration with the market research company YouGov Schweiz. Submissions were assessed in various rounds by a Swiss public panel, an international public panel, and a 25-member international expert jury; the public panels consisted of Swiss and international audience members, while the international jury consisted of former national jurors for their respective countries at the Eurovision Song Contest. Blick had alleged that the final five contendants left in the running were all female artists; among them was Veronica Fusaro with "Slot Machine".

The announcement of the artist took place on 5 March 2025, with Zoë Më, while the song, "Voyage", was revealed and released on 10 March; both reveals were originally set to coincide on the latter date but the announcement of Zoë Më as the selected artist was brought forward following a confrontation between Blick (to which several independent sources had unofficially confirmed her as the representative) and SRF.

== At Eurovision ==
The Eurovision Song Contest 2025 will take place at St. Jakobshalle in Basel, Switzerland, and consist of two semi-finals held on the respective dates of 13 and 15 May and the final on 17 May 2025. All nations with the exceptions of the host country and the "Big Five" (France, Germany, Italy, Spain and the United Kingdom) are required to qualify from one of two semi-finals in order to compete in the final; the top ten countries from each semi-final progress to the final. As the host country, Switzerland automatically qualifies to compete in the final on 17 May 2025, but is also required to broadcast and vote in one of the two semi-finals. This was decided via a draw held during the semi-final allocation draw on 28 January 2025, when it was announced that Switzerland would be voting in the first semi-final. Despite being an automatic qualifier for the final, the Swiss entry will also be performed during the semi-final. On 17 March 2025, during the Heads of Delegation meeting, Switzerland was drawn to perform in position 19.

In the final, Switzerland performed 19th in the running order, following Armenia and preceding Malta. Switzerland placed 10th with 214 points, finishing in 2nd place in the jury voting with 214 points and in last place in the televote with 0 points.

=== Points awarded to Switzerland ===
Points awarded to Switzerland (Final)
Score	Televote	Jury
12 points		Estonia; Poland; Spain
10 points		Denmark; Netherlands; Portugal; San Marino; Sweden
8 points		Albania; Belgium; Croatia; Latvia; Luxembourg; Slovenia
7 points		Armenia; Germany; Iceland; Montenegro; Serbia; Ukraine
6 points		Cyprus; Finland; Greece
5 points		
4 points		Georgia; Italy
3 points		Lithuania; Norway
2 points		France; Malta
1 point		Australia; Azerbaijan

=== Points awarded by Switzerland ===
Points awarded by Switzerland (Semi-final 1)
Score	Televote
12 points	Netherlands
10 points	Albania
8 points	Portugal
7 points	Sweden
6 points	Poland
5 points	San Marino
4 points	Iceland
3 points	Estonia
2 points	Ukraine
1 point	Norway

Points awarded by Switzerland (Final)
Score	Televote	Jury
12 points	Israel	Italy
10 points	Albania	Sweden
8 points	Italy	France
7 points	Greece	Austria
6 points	Austria	Netherlands
5 points	Sweden	Estonia
4 points	France	United Kingdom
3 points	Poland	Finland
2 points	Estonia	Portugal
1 point	Netherlands	Ukraine

=== Detailed voting results ===
Each participating broadcaster assembles a five-member jury panel consisting of music industry professionals who are citizens of the country they represent. Each jury, and individual jury member, is required to meet a strict set of criteria regarding professional background, as well as diversity in gender and age. No member of a national jury was permitted to be related in any way to any of the competing acts in such a way that they cannot vote impartially and independently. The individual rankings of each jury member as well as the nation's televoting results were released shortly after the grand final.

The following members comprised the Swiss jury:

- Cyrill Camenzind
- Giordano Tatum Rush
- Gabriela Mennel
- Mary Clapasson
- Tiffany Athena Limacher

Detailed voting results from Switzerland (Semi-final 1)
R/O	Country	Televote	
R/O	Country	Rank	Points
01	Iceland	7	4
02	Poland	5	6
03	Slovenia	11	
04	Estonia	8	3
05	Ukraine	9	2
06	Sweden	4	7
07	Portugal	3	8
08	Norway	10	1
09	Belgium	15	
10	Azerbaijan	14	
11	San Marino	6	5
12	Albania	2	10
13	Netherlands	1	12
14	Croatia	12	
15	Cyprus	13	

Detailed voting results from Switzerland (Final)
R/O	Country	Jury							Televote	
R/O	Country	Juror A	Juror B	Juror C	Juror D	Juror E	Rank	Points	Rank	Points
01	Norway	17	25	9	14	15	19		18	
02	Luxembourg	25	18	12	15	16	23		19	
03	Estonia	13	2	6	5	22	6	5	9	2
04	Israel	11	22	7	11	17	14		1	12
05	Lithuania	9	13	20	16	20	18		21	
06	Spain	21	7	14	18	21	16		13	
07	Ukraine	10	8	21	10	6	10	1	15	
08	United Kingdom	6	3	11	22	7	7	4	22	
09	Austria	7	17	23	1	2	4	7	5	6
10	Iceland	22	23	8	13	24	20		14	
11	Latvia	14	5	18	12	25	13		20	
12	Netherlands	12	12	10	2	3	5	6	10	1
13	Finland	5	9	4	25	8	8	3	16	
14	Italy	1	1	2	6	4	1	12	3	8
15	Poland	23	14	16	20	23	25		8	3
16	Germany	19	4	25	19	9	12		11	
17	Greece	18	11	5	8	18	11		4	7
18	Armenia	8	19	22	21	19	21		25	
19	Switzerland									
20	Malta	15	16	19	24	12	24		24	
21	Portugal	2	6	15	17	13	9	2	12	
22	Denmark	16	15	13	23	14	22		23	
23	Sweden	4	24	1	4	1	2	10	6	5
24	France	3	10	3	3	5	3	8	7	4
25	San Marino	24	20	24	9	10	17		17	
26	Albania	20	21	17	7	11	15		2	10
