= Ili (singer) =

Scottish singer-songwriter (born 1998)

- Middlemas in 2016
- Born: Emily Middlemas; 26 September 1998 (age 28); Glasgow, Scotland
- Education: Woodfarm High School
- Occupation: Singer-songwriter
- Spouse: Ryan Lawrie (m. 2025)
- Musical career
- Origin: Thornliebank, Renfrewshire, Scotland
- Genre: Pop
- Instruments: Vocals; guitar; piano
- Years active: 2007–present
- Website: thisisili.com

Emily Middlemas (born 26 September 1998), known professionally as Ili (stylised in all lowercase), is a Scottish singer-songwriter. In 2014, she auditioned for the eleventh series of The X Factor but did not progress to the live shows. She returned two years later for the thirteenth series, where she been the ninth contestant eliminated. She competed in both under her birth name, Emily Middlemas, but in 2019, she began using her stage name and independently released her debut extended play, Changes.

== Early and personal life ==
Middlemas was born on 26 September 1998, in Glasgow and attended Woodfarm High School. Middlemas auditioned for Britain’s Got Talent at a young age.

Middlemas has been in a relationship with fellow singer Ryan Lawrie since 2015. In 2022, the couple got engaged. They got married in 2025.

== Career ==
At the age of nine, Middlemas started her performing career in a band called Loud N Proud, and at thirteen, she began writing her own songs. In July 2014, Middlemas won TeenStar, an annual singing competition held in Birmingham. Later that year, she auditioned for the eleventh series of The X Factor, and reached judges' houses, but failed to proceed further.

Middlemas then returned to audition for the thirteenth series of The X Factor in 2016, singing a cover of Stevie Wonder's "Master Blaster (Jammin')". Middlemas was placed in the "girls" category and reached the live shows, where she was mentored by Simon Cowell. Following the eliminations of Gifty Louise in week 4 and Sam Lavery in week 6, Middlemas became Cowell's last remaining act in the competition. She was in the bottom two in the semi-final, against Matt Terry, and was the ninth contestant eliminated.

The X Factor performances and results
Show	Song choice	Theme	Result
Auditions	"Master Blaster (Jammin')" – Stevie Wonder	—N/a	Through to bootcamp
Bootcamp	Unknown	—N/a	Through to six-chair challenge
Six-chair challenge	"Girls Just Want to Have Fun" – Cyndi Lauper	—N/a	Through to judges' houses
Judges' houses	"Ex's and Oh's" – Elle King	—N/a	Through to live shows
Live show 1	"Closer" – The Chainsmokers feat. Halsey	Express Yourself	Safe (3rd)
Live show 2	"Stop! In the Name of Love" – The Supremes	Motown	Safe (3rd)
Live show 3	"How Will I Know" – Whitney Houston	Divas & Legends	Safe (3rd)
Live show 4	"Creep" – Radiohead	Fright Night	Safe (1st)
Live show 5	"What Makes You Beautiful" – One Direction	Girlband vs Boyband	Safe (3rd)
Live show 6	"Wishing on a Star" – Rose Royce	Disco	Safe (4th)
Live show 7	"It Must Have Been Love" – Roxette	Movies	Safe (4th)
Quarter-Final	"Toxic" – Britney Spears	Louis Loves	Safe (2nd)
Quarter-Final	"Human" – Rag'n'Bone Man	Contestant's Choice	Safe (2nd)
Semi-Final	"Happy Xmas (War Is Over)" – John Lennon & Yoko Ono & Plastic Ono Band	Christmas	Bottom two (4th)
Semi-Final	"Mad World" – Michael Andrews featuring Gary Jules	Contestant's Choice	Bottom two (4th)
Semi-Final	"Wings" – Birdy	Sing-off	Eliminated (fourth place)

In 2017, Middlemas released her first single, "Lost and Found", after which she embarked on her debut headline tour across the United Kingdom. The Memory Lane Tour consisted of 11 dates. In March 2018, she released her second single, "Layla", a tribute to a young girl who died from neuroblastoma cancer. Later that year, she released two further singles, titled "Habit" and "Broken Record".

In August 2019, Middlemas announced that she had adopted the stage name Ili. That same month, she released "A Little Bit" as her debut single. In September 2019, "Changes" was released as the title track from her debut EP, Changes. On 1 November 2019, Ili released the five-track EP Changes. She then released the single "Breath" on 8 May 2020. Two years later, Ili released "Time Goes By". Then in May 2023, she released the song "Tongue Tied", which was noted by Notion for "beginning to transcend Scotland’s borders and make an impact globally". In 2025, she was a co-writer on "Voyage", recorded by Zoë Më to represent Switzerland in the Eurovision Song Contest 2025. Middlemas also recorded a simgle for the Italian cartoon, Winx Club: The Magic is Back in 2025. The song is titled "Step into the Dark". In 2026, Middlemas co-composed the track "Hawaii" with Lawrie for K-pop group Red Velvet's second special summer EP Velvet Summer, in collaboration with member Joy who penned the Korean lyrics.

== Discography ==
=== Extended plays ===
Title	Details
Changes	Released: 1 November 2019; Label: Independent; Format: Digital download, streaming
It's Giving...	Released: 16 February 2024; Label: Independent; Format: Digital download, streaming
Confessions of a People Pleaser	Released: 28 August 2026; Label: Independent; Format: Digital download, streaming

=== Singles ===
==== As solo artist ====
Title	Year	Album
"Lost and Found"	2017	Non-album singles
"Layla"	2018	Non-album singles
"Habit"	2018	Non-album singles
"Broken Record"	2018	Non-album singles
"A Little Bit"	2019	Changes
"Changes"	2019	Changes
"Plastic Knife"	2019	Changes
"Breath"	2020	Non-album singles
"Comedown"	2020	Non-album singles
"Time Goes By"	2022	It's Giving…
"2 Cool 2 Be Somebody"	2022	It's Giving…
"Tongue Tied"	2023	It's Giving…
"Saturday"	2023	It's Giving…
"Gelato"	2024	Non-album single
"Mean to Me"	2025	Confessions of a People Pleaser
"Super Elastic"	2026	Confessions of a People Pleaser
"Tears Ago"	2026	Confessions of a People Pleaser
"In Your Head"	2026	Confessions of a People Pleaser

==== As featured artist ====
Title	Year	Album
"Strange World" (Ummet Ozcan featuring Ili)	2021	Non-album single
