= Veronica Fusaro =

Swiss singer-songwriter

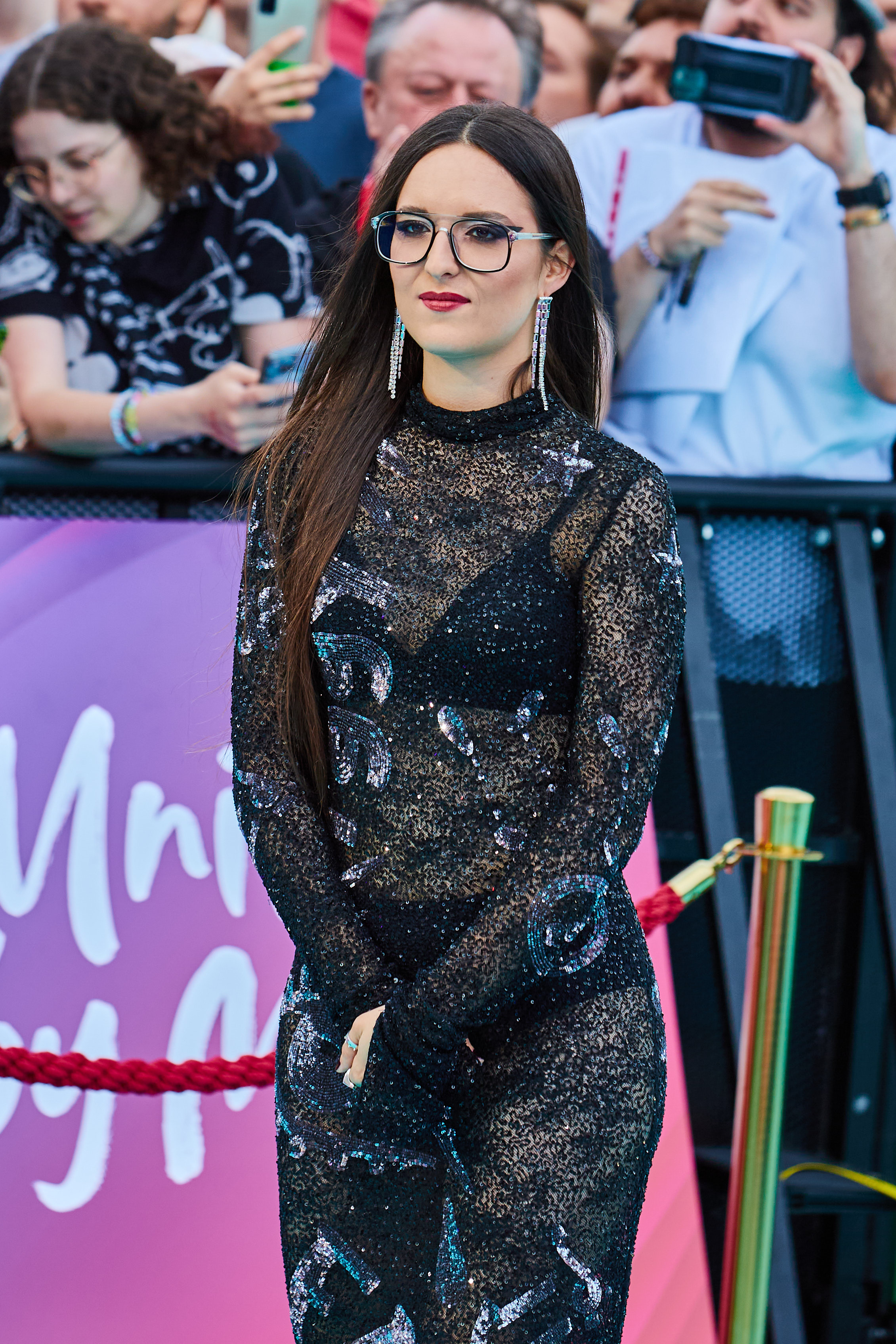
- Fusaro in 2026

Background information
- Born: Thun, Switzerland
- Genre: Pop
- Occupations: Singer; songwriter
- Years active: 2017–present

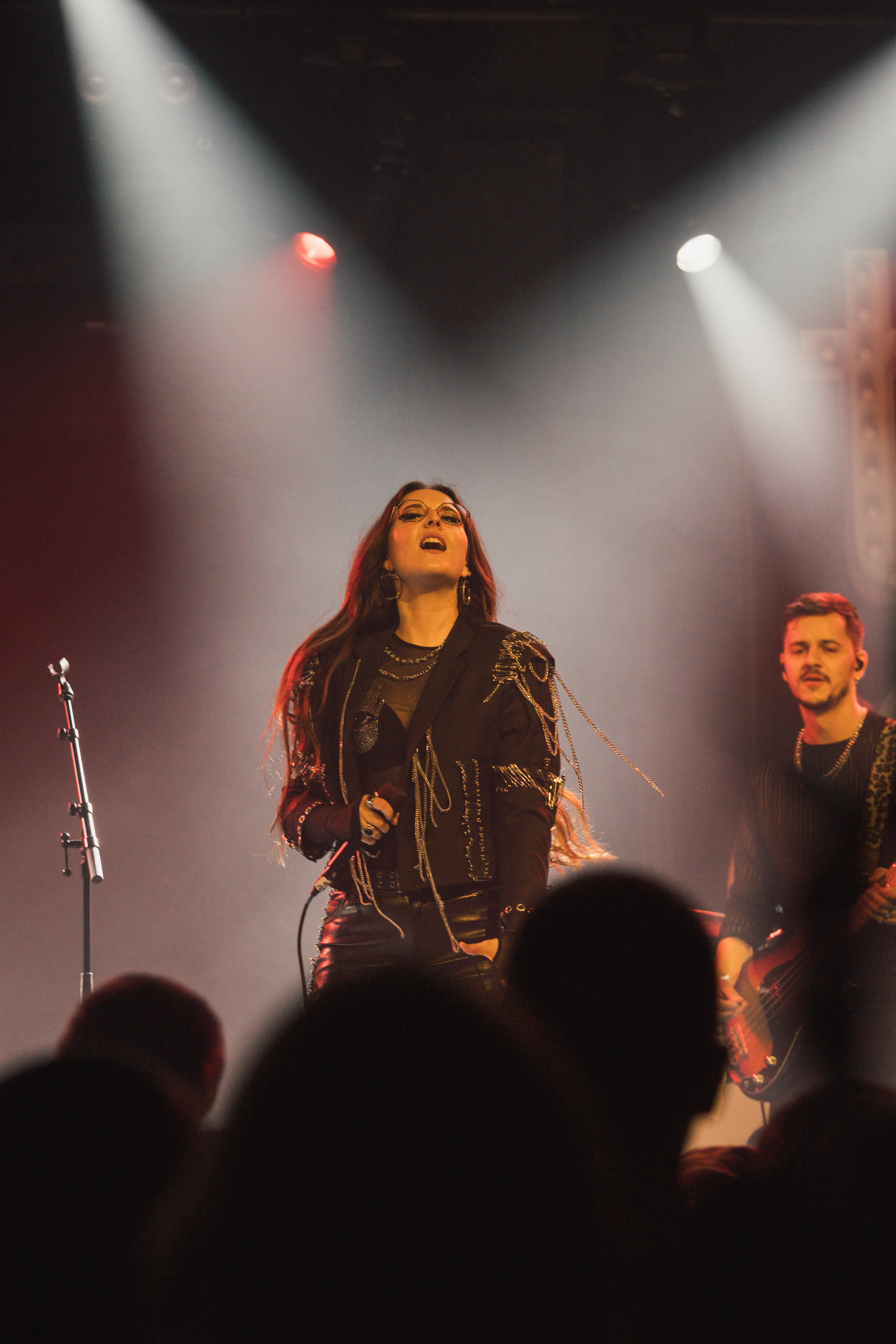
Fusaro in 2026

Veronica Fusaro is a Swiss singer and songwriter. Her debut album All the Colors of the Sky, released in 2023, reached the fifth position on the Swiss Hitparade. She represented Switzerland in the Eurovision Song Contest 2026 with the song "Alice".

== Biography ==
Born in Thun to an Italian father and a Swiss mother, in 2014, Fusaro took part in the second season of The Voice of Switzerland, broadcast on the German-language channel SRF 1. Her performance of "A Night like This" by Caro Emerald earned her the approval of Stefanie Heinzmann, who accepted her into her team. Her journey continued until the Knockout stage, where she was ultimately eliminated.

In 2016, she was awarded the Demo of the Year award by the Demotape Clinic association, an accolade that caught the attention of national radio station SRF 3, which subsequently named her Best Talent of the month of May 2016. In 2018, she performed at the annual Swiss Music Awards ceremony.

Fusaro rose to prominence in 2019 with the single "Rollercoaster" which, thanks also to the collaboration with the MX3 circuit, was promoted through the main radio stations of the Swiss Confederation. In the same year she also participated in the Glastonbury Festival, and was the opening artist for Mark Knopfler during the Nîmes Festival, in France. In 2023, coinciding with the release of her debut studio album All the Colors of the Sky, she received the Music Prize of the city of Thun.

On 20 January 2026, the Swiss broadcaster SRG SSR announced that it had internally selected Fusaro to represent Switzerland in the Eurovision Song Contest 2026, which will take place in Vienna, Austria. Her entry for the contest, "Alice", was presented on 11 March. She performed in Semi Final 2, and qualified with both the juries and televote, but finished in 11th place overall, failing to reach the final. Fusaro became the first Swiss representative not to qualify since 2018.

== Discography ==
=== Studio albums ===
List of studio albums, with selected details
Title	Details	Peak chart positions
Title	Details	SWI
All the Colors of the Sky	Released: 20 January 2023; Label: Deepdive Records; Formats: CD, digital download, streaming	5
Looking for Connection	Released: 24 October 2025; Label: Deepdive Records; Formats: CD, digital download, streaming	12

=== Extended plays ===
List of EPs, with selected details
Title	Details	Peak chart positions
Title	Details	SWI
Lost in Thought	Released: 15 December 2017; Label: Deepdive Records; Formats: CD, digital download, streaming	—
Ice Cold	Released: 9 February 2018; Label: Deepdive Records; Formats: CD, digital download, streaming	16
Sunkissed	Released: 4 October 2019; Label: Deepdive Records; Formats: CD, digital download, streaming	84

=== Singles ===
List of singles, with year, album and chart positions
Title	Year	Peak chart positions		Album or EP
Title	Year	SWI	SWI Air.	Album or EP
"Pluto"	2017	—	—	Lost in Thought
"Never Getting Down"	2017	—	—	Ice Cold
"Better If I Go"	2017	—	—	Ice Cold
"Lost in Thought"	2017	—	—	Lost in Thought
"Venom"	2018	—	—	Non-album single
"Lie to Me"	2019	—	—	Sunkissed
"Rollercoaster"	2019	—	—	Sunkissed
"Run My Mind"	2019	—	—	Sunkissed
"Beach"	2020	—	—	All the Colors of the Sky
"Fool"	2021	—	—	All the Colors of the Sky
"Better with You"	2022	—	—	All the Colors of the Sky
"Summer Lightning"	2022	—	—	All the Colors of the Sky
"Cry Me an Ocean"	2022	—	—	All the Colors of the Sky
"Wreck Me"	2022	—	—	All the Colors of the Sky
"A Modern Tale"	2023	—	—	All the Colors of the Sky
"Slot Machine"	2024	—	—	Looking for Connection
"Jealousy"	2025	—	—	Looking for Connection
"No Rain No Tears"	2025	—	—	Looking for Connection
"Gold Rush"	2025	—	—	Looking for Connection
"Alice"	2026	94	6	Looking for Connection
"—" denotes a recording that did not chart or was not released in that territory.

Awards and achievements
Preceded by Zoë Më with "Voyage"	Switzerland in the Eurovision Song Contest; 2026	Succeeded by TBA
