= Fredrik Rydman =

Swedish dancer

Fredrik "Benke" Rydman (born 29 August 1974) is one of the members from Bounce Streetdance Company. He was also a judge on the first season of So You Think You Can Dance Scandinavia.

Rydman choreographed the opening number at the Eurovision Song Contest 2013 in Malmö on 14 May. In 2015, Rydman co-developed and choreographed the stage presentation of Måns Zelmerlöw's song "Heroes", for both Melodifestivalen 2015 and the performance which went on to win the Eurovision Song Contest 2015.

He choreographed the Eurovision Song Contest 2024 winning performance of the song "The Code" performed by Switzerland's entrant Nemo.

He choreographed, together with Keisha von Arnold, the Eurovision Song Contest 2026 winning performance of the song "Bangaranga" performed by Bulgaria's entrant Dara.
