= Zoë Më =

Swiss singer (born 2000)

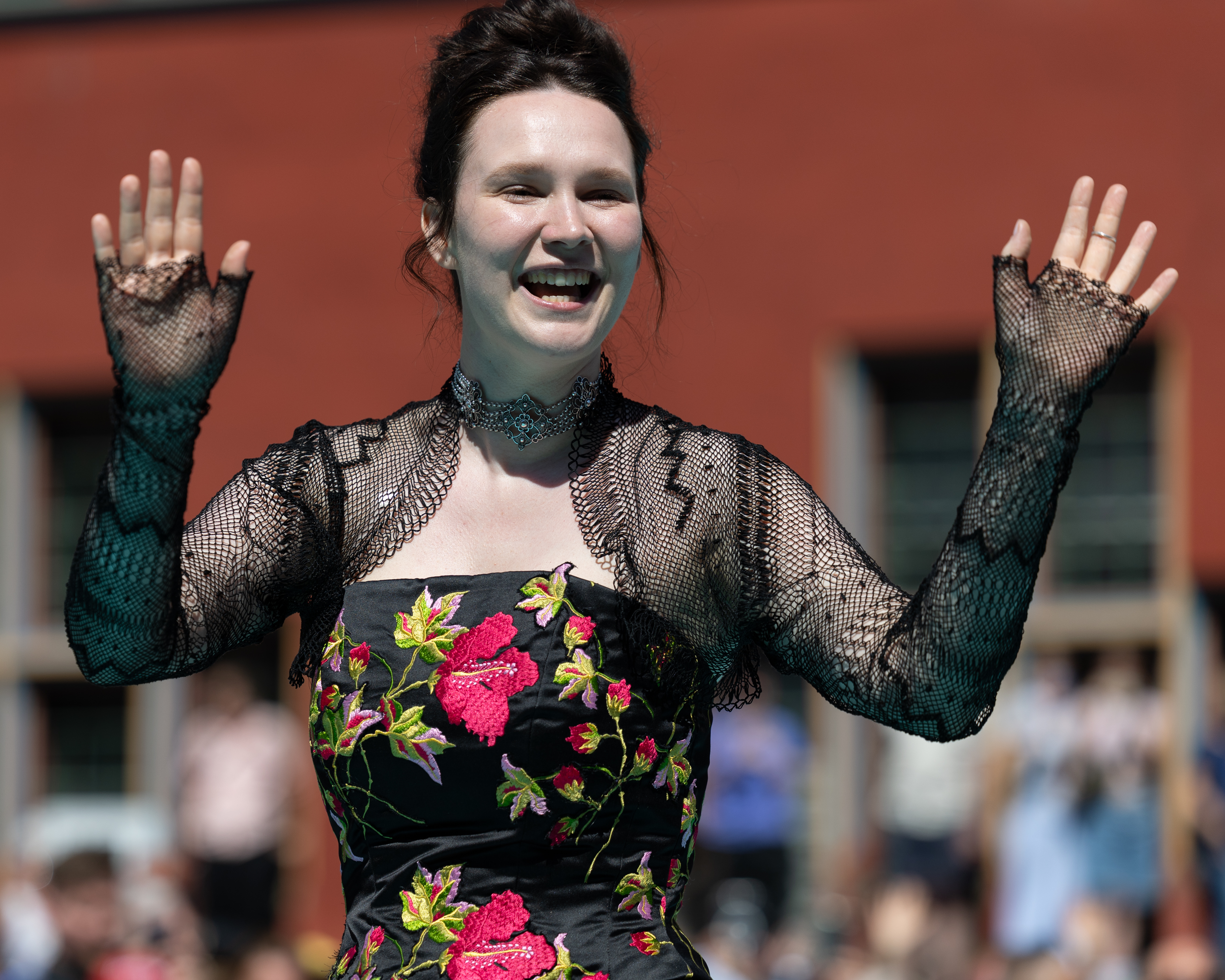
- Zoë Më in 2025

Background information
- Born: Zoë Anina Kressler; 6 October 2000 (age 26); Basel, Switzerland
- Genres: Pop; chanson
- Occupations: Singer; songwriter
- Instrument: Vocals
- Years active: 2018-present
- Website: zoe-me-music.com

Zoë Anina Kressler (born 6 October 2000), known professionally as Zoë Më, is a Swiss singer and songwriter. She represented Switzerland in the Eurovision Song Contest 2025 on home soil in Basel with the song "Voyage", finishing in 10th place overall with 214 points.

== Career ==
Kressler was born in Basel, Switzerland and lived in Germany before moving back to Switzerland, to the city of Fribourg, with her family in 2009. She began writing her own songs at the age of ten and is known for her unique poetry-pop style, which combines German and French, as well as pop and chanson.

In 2024, Kressler won the RTS Artiste Radar and SRF 3 Best Talent awards, previously won by artists such as Nemo and Marius Bear. Throughout her career, she has performed at prestigious events, including the Montreux Jazz Festival and the Luzern Live stage, and has also been a guest artist on tours with Remo Forrer and Joya Marleen.

=== Eurovision Song Contest 2025 ===
On 5 March 2025, the Swiss Broadcasting Corporation (SRG SSR) announced that Kressler would represent Switzerland at the Eurovision Song Contest 2025 in Basel with the song "Voyage". She came 10th overall receiving 214 points from the jury-vote, but 0 points ('nul points') from the public vote. She holds the record for the largest difference in placement in a Eurovision final between jury and television 24 placements (2nd with jury, 26th with televote)

== Discography ==
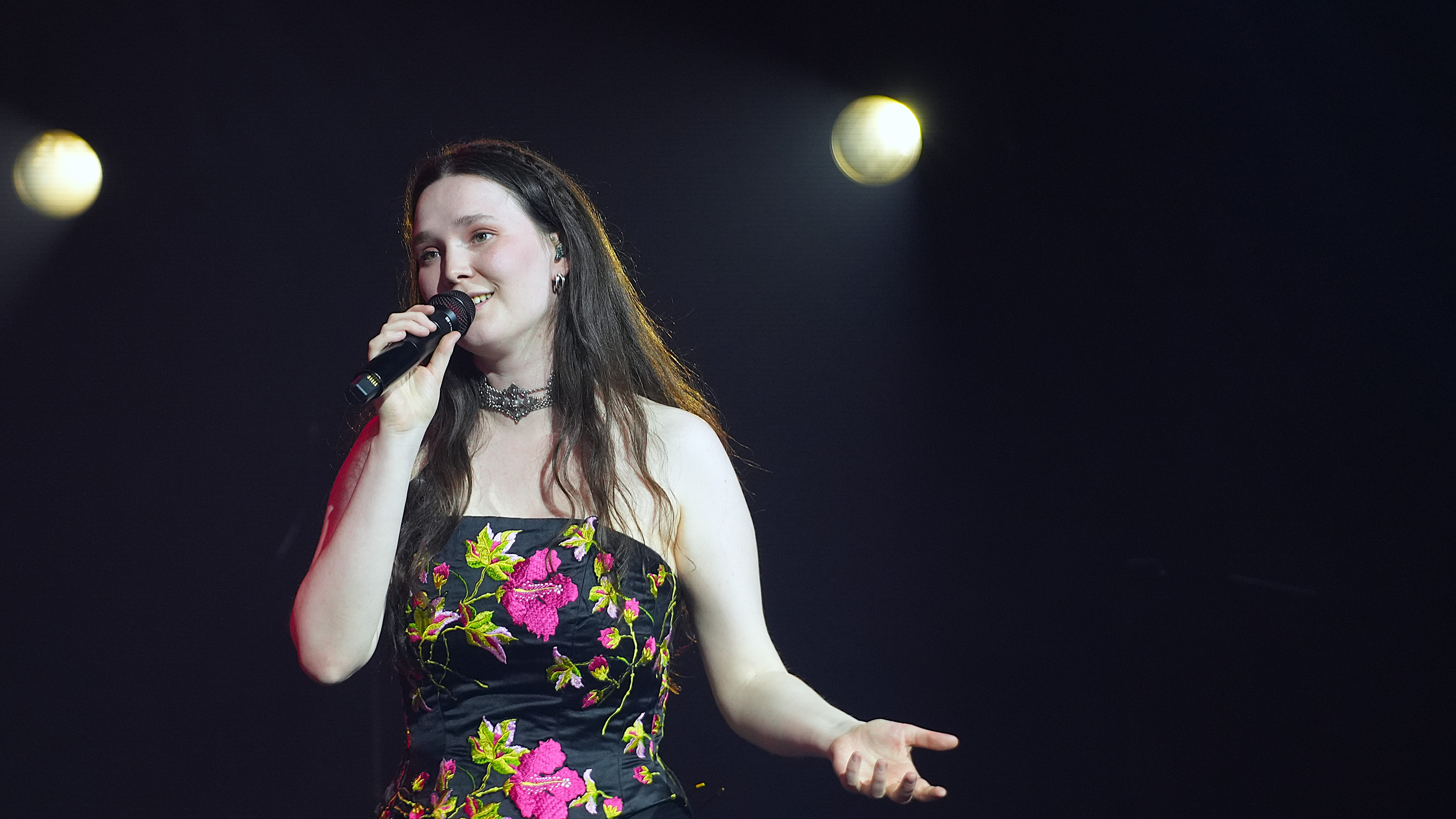
Zoë Më opened the Baloise Session 2025 together with Amy Macdonald.

=== Studio albums ===
Title	Details
Momoko	Released: 4 September 2020; Label: Black Paper Boat; Format: Digital download, streaming

=== Extended plays ===
Title	Details
Le Loup	Released: 15 March 2024; Label: Self-released; Format: Digital download, streaming
Dorienne Gris	Released: 17 May 2024; Label: Self-released; Format: Digital download, streaming
Loup Garou	Release date: 21 November 2025; Label: Manifester; Format: Digital download, streaming

=== Singles ===
Title	Year	Peak chart positions				Album
Title	Year	SWI	SWI Air.	AUT	NLD	Album
"Bärenbrüder"	2018	—	—	—	—	Momoko
"Endlose Straße" (with Pablo)	2019	—	—	—	—	Momoko
"Itsuko"	2020	—	—	—	—	Non-album single
"Aimée"	2020	—	—	—	—	Momoko
"Fallende Tänzer"	2020	—	—	—	—	Momoko
"Kartenhaus"	2020	—	—	—	—	Momoko
"Das Lied der Leichtigkei"	2021	—	—	—	—	Non-album single
"Ok"	2023	—	—	—	—	Le Loup
"Lied ohne Ende"	2023	—	—	—	—	Le Loup
"Liste des Interdits"	2024	—	—	—	—	Le Loup
"Overdose"	2024	—	—	—	—	Non-album single
"Voyage"	2025	7	16	37	6	Loup Garou
"Million de Mois"	2025	—	—	—	—	Loup Garou
"Durch die Nacht"	2025	—	—	—	—	Loup Garou
"Clair de Lune"	2025	—	—	—	—	Loup Garou
"Valse à Demi" (with Stephan Eicher)	2026	—	—	—	—	Loup Garou
"Jamais Été (Cool)"	2026	—	44	—	—	Loup Garou
"Dis-moi Pierre"	2026	—	—	—	—	Non-album single
"—" denotes a recording that did not chart or was not released in that territory.

== Awards and nominations ==
Year	Award	Category	Nominee(s)	Result	Ref.
2025	Eurovision Awards	Artistic Vision	Herself	Nominated	
2026	Swiss Music Awards	Best Breaking Act	Herself	Won	
2026	Swiss Music Awards	Best Hit	"Voyage"	Nominated	

Awards and achievements
Preceded by Nemo with "The Code"	Switzerland in the Eurovision Song Contest; 2025	Succeeded by Veronica Fusaro with "Alice"
