= Bote der Urschweiz =

Swiss daily newspaper

Coordinates: 47.0195564°N 8.6527565°E

- Type: Daily newspaper, Online newspaper
- Format: Swiss
- Owner: Bote der Urschweiz AG
- Founder(s): Melchior and Dominik Triner
- Publisher: Triner AG
- Editor-in-chief: Dominik Jordan
- Founded: 1858; 167 years ago
- Language: German
- Headquarters: Schmiedgasse 7; 6431 Schwyz
- City: Schwyz
- Country: Switzerland
- Circulation: 13'390 (as of 2024)
- Readership: 40'000
- ISSN: 1424-4942
- OCLC number: 611642945
- Website: www.bote.ch (in German)

Bote der Urschweiz is a Swiss German-language online and daily newspaper, published in Schwyz. It is the regional newspaper for the districts Schwyz, Gersau and Küssnacht and the biggest newspaper in the canton of Schwyz.

== History ==
The Bote der Urschweiz was founded in 1858 by the brothers Melchior and Dominik Triner as the Wochenzeitung der Urschweiz. From 1859 to 1862, it was published twice a week under the name Der Bote aus der Urschweiz, after which it was renamed to its current name. In December 1979, the paper started publishing three times a week and in November 1994, after the integration of the newspaper Schwyzer Zeitung into the Luzerner Zeitung, daily. In 1997, the newspaper started a partnership with Die Südostschweiz.

The newspaper is regarded as liberal, due to its past Gesinnungsgemeinschaft with the Liberal Party of Switzerland.

Since 2014, the newspaper has been in a partnership with the Luzerner Zeitung, and it integrated their local newspaper, the Neue Schwyzer Zeitung.

In June 2024, it was announced that the printing would be done externally by CH Media starting in 2025.

== Editors-in-chief ==
- 1950—1990: Karl Wiget
- 1993—2000: Jürg Auf der Maur
- 2001—2013: Josias Clavadetscher
- 2014—2021: Jürg Auf der Maur
- 2021—2023: Flurina Valsecchi
- 2023—present: Dominik Jordan
