= Voyage (Zoë Më song) =

2025 song by Zoë Më

Single by Zoë Më

from the EP Loup Garou
- Language: French
- Released: 10 March 2025
- Genre: Chanson
- Length: 2:59
- Label: Warner; Manifester
- Songwriters: Emily Middlemas; Tom Oehler; Zoë Anina Kressler
- Producers: Pele Loriano; Tom Oehler

Zoë Më singles chronology
"Overdose" (2024)	"Voyage" (2025)	"Million de Mois" (2025)

Music video
- "Voyage" on YouTube

Eurovision Song Contest 2025 entry
- Country: Switzerland
- Artist: Zoë Më
- Language: French
- Composers: Emily Middlemas; Tom Oehler; Zoë Anina Kressler
- Lyricists: Emily Middlemas; Tom Oehler; Zoë Anina Kressler

Finals performance
- Final result: 10th
- Final points: 214

Entry chronology
- ◄ "The Code" (2024)
- "Alice" (2026) ►

Official performance video
- "Voyage" (First Semi-Final) on YouTube "Voyage" (Grand Final) on YouTube

"Voyage" (French pronunciation: [vwajaʒ]; transl. "Journey") is a song by Swiss singer-songwriter Zoë Më. It was written by Më, Tom Oehler, and Emily Middlemas, and produced by Oehler and Pele Loriano. The song was released as a single on 10 March 2025 through Warner Music Germany and Manifester Music. It represented Switzerland in the Eurovision Song Contest 2025, where it finished tenth place with 214 points, all from the professional juries.

It is described by Më as a song that encourages togetherness, kindness, and friendship despite hate and challenges, comparing humans to flowers. The song received mixed reviews. Its musical composition was praised, but concerns were raised that the song would not be a contender for a victory at Eurovision. "Voyage" enjoyed commercial success, peaking at number seven in its native country and within the top ten in the Netherlands.

== Composition and release ==
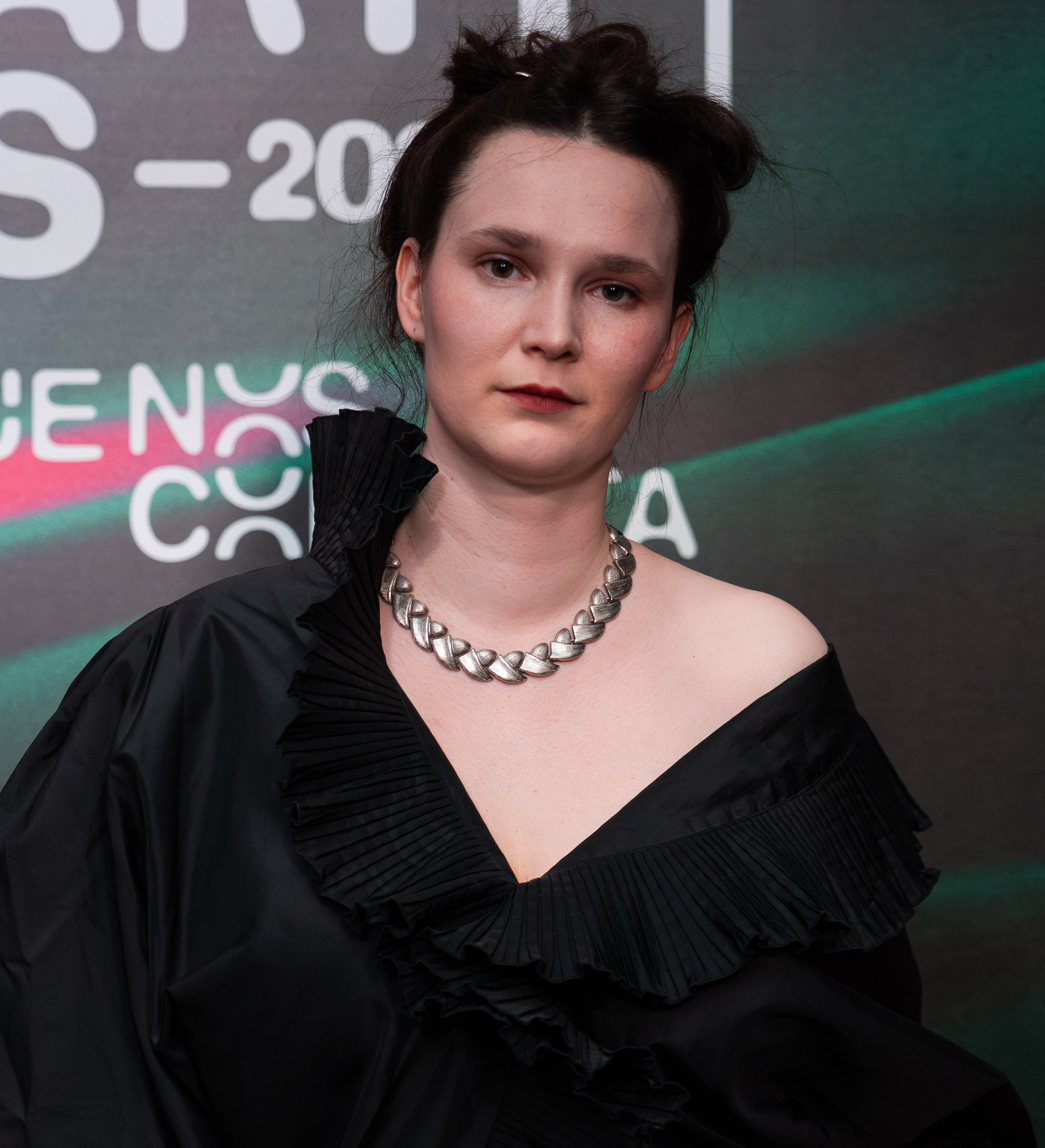
Zoë Më (pictured in 2025) co-wrote "Voyage" alongside Emily Middlemas and Tom Oehler.

"Voyage" was written by Zoë Më, Tom Oehler, and Emily Middlemas, and produced by Oehler and Pele Loriano. In an Blick interview, she stated was inspired to write the song while living in Scotland after seeing the "cozy atmosphere" of a Christmas tree farm and surrounding sheep. The song was written in July 2022 in a SUISA songwriting camp. According to Më, Middlemas and Oehler joined production after Më wrote the first parts of the song. The song is entirely in French; according to Më, she chose French because it was her favourite language and that "in French, I can create images more easily". "Voyage" was released on 10 March 2025.

In an interview with Eurovision Stars, she described the musical composition of the chanson song as a "journey", with the composition changing numerous times within the song in regards to its tempo, lyrics, and music dynamics. The song itself compares humans to flowers, encouraging kindness and friendship to promote the growth of a person despite "all of the negativity that is going around the world" and the challenges of a friendship. She states a metaphor within the song that "flowers are more beautiful being watered instead of cut", adding that by treating others nicely instead of hate, "we can all be the most beautiful flower, the best version of ourselves".

=== Music video and promotion ===
Along with the song's release, an accompanying music video directed by Ruy Okamura was released on the same day. To further promote the song, Më participated in various Eurovision pre-parties before the contest throughout the months of March and April 2025, including the Nordic Eurovision Party on 22 March and Pre-Party ES on 19 April.

== Critical reception ==
=== Swiss media and personalities ===
"Voyage" was neutrally received in most critical reviews. Blick's Michel Imhof described the song as an "antithesis" compared to other songs focusing on "emphasizing on loud and funny sounds" competing in Eurovision 2025, stating his prediction that the song would score high with the Eurovision juries due to Më's vocal abilities. Tages-Anzeiger's Ane Hebeisen wrote a mixed review on "Voyage", comparing the early parts of the song to a Merci chocolate commercial. Hebeisen added that while he thought the song might be "a little too cozy and unexciting to stand out in a competition in which 37 participants cram everything the entertainment industry has come up with in the last 30 years", he wrote that the song was better as a reminder of the importance of family and friendships. Watson's Nadine Sommerhalder wrote that while the song had no chance to win Eurovision due to not being exciting enough for the contest, the song left listeners feelings of "pretty, sweet, beautiful. Nice! Nothing more." St. Galler Tagblatt's Stefan Künzli described the song as one "for the heart and soul". While he admitted he thought the song had "outsider chances" at winning Eurovision, he wrote that "we are convinced that Zoë Më can continue the Swiss success story of recent years." In contrast, Nemo Mettler, the Swiss participant and the winner of the 2024 edition of Eurovision, stated to Schweizer Radio und Fernsehen (SRF) that the song "has a very good chance [to win]... Zoë Më has an incredibly beautiful song. It's mega touching and emotional. The performance is unique. I don't think there's much standing in the way."

=== Eurovision-related and international media ===
In a Wiwibloggs review containing several reviews from several critics, the song was rated 7.17 out of 10 points, earning 13th out of the 37 songs competing in that year's Eurovision in the site's annual ranking that year. ESC Beat's Doron Lahav ranked the song third overall out of 37, writing that the song was an "excellent ballad" due to its unusual musical structure. Jon O'Brien, a writer for Vulture, ranked the song ninth overall, stating that while he thought the song was "this year's prettiest entry" in Eurovision 2025, Më's vocals were "fragile". He further criticised the orchestral background for being "light of touch". Rob Picheta, writer for American outlet CNN, ranked it fourth out of the 26 finalists in Eurovision 2025, describing it as "stunning... gorgeously sung and cinematically shot – this will stand out amid its chaotic competitors." The Times' Ed Potton ranked it 25th out of 26 finalists, describing it as "immeasurably duller" compared to Nemo's "The Code" and rating "Voyage" two out of five stars.

The BBC's Mark Savage described the song as "delicate" and soft, stating that it was "a welcome oasis of calm amidst the steamy sauna sessions, moody goth haircuts and thrusting innuendo". Yle's Eva Frantz gave the song an 8 out of 10 rating, writing that the song was "dreamy and undulating", but admitting that "there's a risk that the entry will feel a bit insignificant and pale in the crowd". Eurovision Stars' Jon Lewak stated that the song was "quite original for a pop song", adding that the song was "likeable, but not lovable".

== Eurovision Song Contest ==
=== Internal selection ===
On 3 July 2024, the Swiss Broadcasting Corporation (SRG SSR) announced its intent to select its representative and song for the 69th edition of the Eurovision Song Contest. Submissions for the Swiss bid occurred in two rounds: an initial jury round which was used to shortlist five candidates for another jury round. On 5 March, SRG announced Zoë Më as their representative for Eurovision 2025, with "Voyage" releasing five days after the initial announcement.

=== At Eurovision ===
The Eurovision Song Contest 2025 took place at the St. Jakobshalle in Basel, Switzerland, and consisted of two semi-finals held on the respective dates of 13 and 15 May and the final on 17 May 2025. As Switzerland won the previous year's contest, Switzerland automatically qualified for the grand final. On 17 March, Më was drawn to perform 19th in the grand final, ahead of Armenia's Parg and before Malta's Miriana Conte. Më was also additionally drawn to perform in a non-competitive spot in the first semi-final.

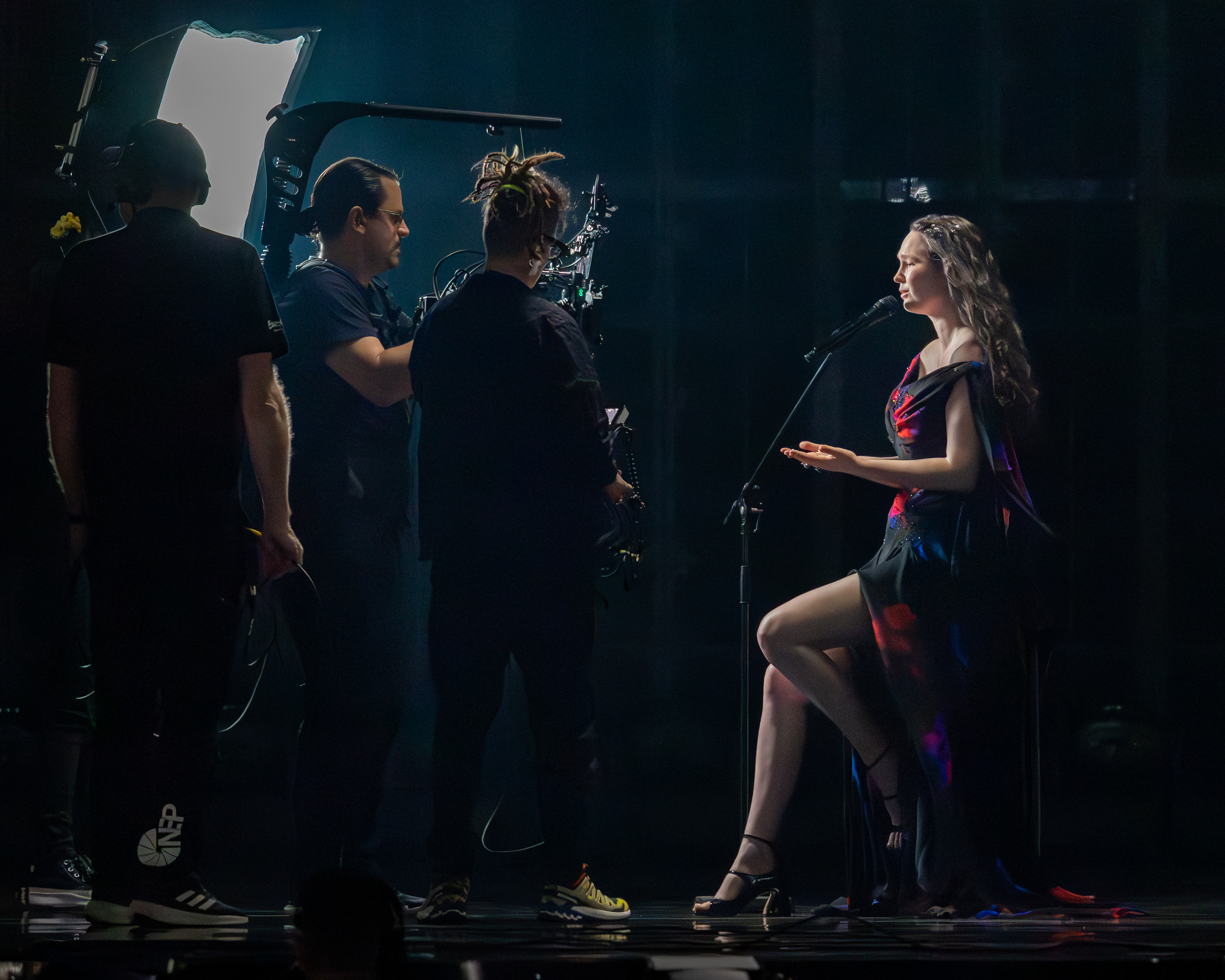
Më performing "Voyage" at a Eurovision 2025 dress rehearsal before the grand final.

For its Eurovision performance, Theo Adams was appointed as the staging director. The entire performance is filmed in one camera shot and only features Më. She stated that she chose to only have one camera filming the performance because "it's complicated, but at the same time, that's the charm of the performance... [it's] what makes people really, really close and feel all my emotions." The performance itself starts off in dark lighting on a close-up shot of Më, who wears a black dress decorated with red, blue, and purple flowers designed by Rowanne Studio. At the start of the song's bridge, wind, smoke, and "overexposed flashes" disrupt a calm atmosphere, eventually turning to the stage audience illuminated by phone lights. By the end of the performance, the calm and dark nature at the beginning of the performance returns. During the semi-final performance, the steadicam used froze midway through the performance.

Më performed a repeat of her performance in the grand final on 17 May. The song performed in 19th, after Armenia's Parg and before Malta's Miriana Conte. After the results were announced, Më finished in tenth with 214 total points, with a split score of 214 jury points and 0 televoting points. In the juries, the song received three sets of the maximum 12 points from Estonia, Poland, and Spain, in the process finishing in second with the juries. In the televote, the highest position a country ranked the song was 11th, given by Portugal. In response to her result, she stated in interviews with Swiss media that she was "mega satisfied" with her performance. She added that she wished to focus on her second place placement within the juries, stating that it was "an award that means that the song stood out both as a composition and I as a singer with my voice and stage performance. So professional music experts rated me very highly."

== Track listing ==
Digital download/streaming

1. "Voyage" – 2:59

Digital download/streaming – Louane duet

1. "Voyage" (feat. Louane) – 2:40

Digital download/streaming – Festive version

1. "Voyage" (Version festive) – 2:39

== Charts ==
Chart performance for "Voyage"
Chart (2025)	Peak position
Austria (Ö3 Austria Top 40)	37
Greece International (IFPI)	36
Iceland (Tónlistinn)	37
Lithuania (AGATA)	18
Netherlands (Single Tip)	6
Sweden Heatseeker (Sverigetopplistan)	3
Switzerland (Schweizer Hitparade)	7
UK Singles Downloads (OCC)	49
UK Singles Sales (OCC)	51

== Release history ==
Release history and formats for "Voyage"
Region	Date	Format(s)	Version	Label	Ref.
Various	10 March 2025	Digital download; streaming	Original	Warner; Manifester	
Italy	16 May 2025	Radio airplay	Original	Warner Italy	
Various	20 June 2025	Digital download; streaming	Louane duet	Warner; Manifester	
Various	28 November 2025	Digital download; streaming	Festive version	Warner; Manifester	
