= The Code (Nemo song) =

2024 song by Nemo

Single by Nemo

from the album Arthouse
- Released: 29 February 2024
- Genre: Drum and bass; EDM
- Length: 3:00
- Label: Better Now
- Composers: Nemo Mettler; Linda Dale; Benji Alasu; Lasse Nymann
- Lyricists: Nemo Mettler; Linda Dale
- Producers: Lasse Midtsian Nymann; Benjamin Alasu; Tom Oehler; Wojciech Kostrzewa; Pele Loriano; Nemo Mettler; Nikodem Milewski

Nemo singles chronology
"Falling Again" (2024)	"The Code" (2024)	"Eurostar" (2024)

Music video
- "The Code" on YouTube

Eurovision Song Contest 2024 entry
- Country: Switzerland
- Artist: Nemo
- Language: English

Finals performance
- Semi-final result: 4th
- Semi-final points: 132
- Final result: 1st
- Final points: 591

Entry chronology
- ◄ "Watergun" (2023)
- "Voyage" (2025) ►

Official performance video
- "The Code" (Semi-Final 2) on YouTube "The Code" (Grand Final) on YouTube

"The Code" is a song by Swiss singer Nemo. It was written by Nemo along with three other songwriters and was released on 29 February 2024 through Better Now Records. It represented Switzerland in the Eurovision Song Contest 2024, where it won the contest with 591 points. In the process, the song became the first victory for the country since "Ne partez pas sans moi" by Celine Dion in 1988 and the first winning song in the history of the contest by a non-binary artist.

It has been described by Nemo as a song that details their experience with accepting their non-binary identity. "The Code" enjoyed widespread acclaim upon its release, with praise being given towards the mixture of multiple musical genres and styles within the song, becoming a favourite to win the contest in the months heading into the competition. However, while the performance was also met with praise, its victory was met with mixed, highly polarized reactions amongst various social and political groups. The song drew commercial success, peaking at number one in its native country of Switzerland and Greece, and peaking within the top five in a further six countries.

== Background and composition ==
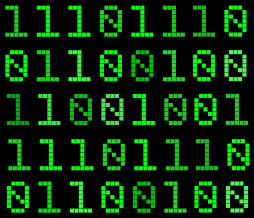
The idea of binary code is used within the song to display Nemo's non-conformance to a binary gender system.

"The Code" was written by Benjamin Alasu, Lasse Midtsian Nymann, Linda Dale, and Nemo Mettler, and was composed at a SUISA songwriting camp. BBC's Mark Savage described the song as a "drum and bass EDM opera" and said its chorus was inspired by The Magic Flute by Wolfgang Amadeus Mozart. In press statements, Nemo stated that the song details their realization of their non-binary identity, stating that realizing they are non-binary has given them "freedom" and that by entering the Eurovision Song Contest, they can "stand up for the entire LGBTQIA+ community". According to Nemo, when accepting that they didn't "feel like a man or a woman... I had to break a few codes"; the song references binary code, which is meant to represent the binary classification of genders. Nemo also declares within the song that they have found their "kingdom come", refusing to conform to traditional gender classification norms and stick to only one musical style. Nemo later added in Eurovision World, "being non-binary is a big part my truth... You're always learning about yourself. It never ends."

== Music video and promotion ==
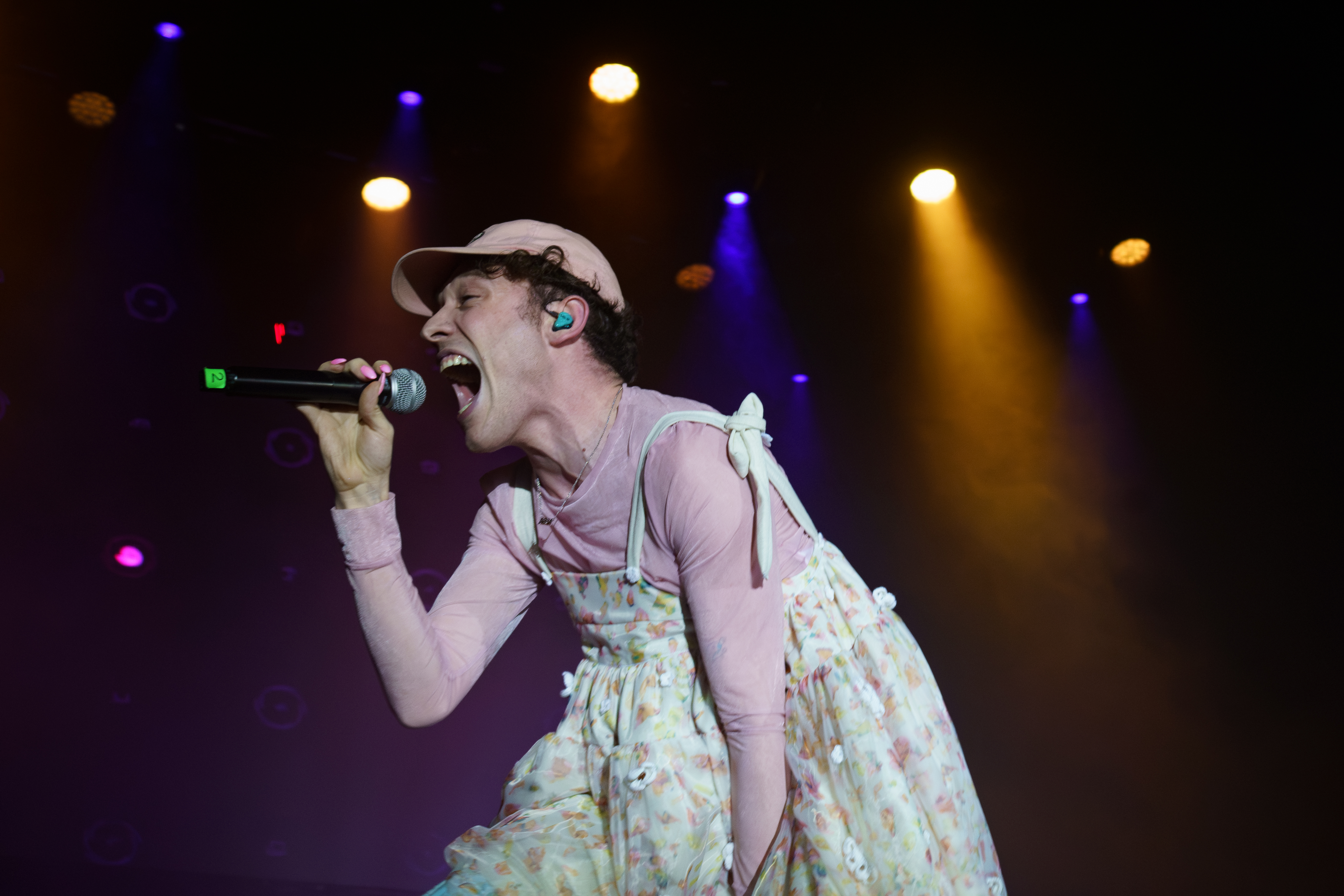
Nemo performing at Pre-Party ES. Nemo embarked on a promotional tour, performing the song on various occasions in the months before the Eurovision Song Contest 2024.

Along with the song's release upon its announcement, an accompanying music video was released on the same day. To further promote the song, Nemo confirmed their intent to participate in various Eurovision pre-parties throughout the months of March and April, including Pre-Party ES 2024 on 30 March, Eurovision in Concert 2024 on 13 April, and the Nordic Eurovision Party 2024 on 14 April. They also performed it during other occasions before the contest, including on Swiss television show MusicStar – Die Revival-Show on 31 March, and a performance at the Embassy of Sweden in Bern to honor ABBA's 50th anniversary of winning the Eurovision Song Contest 1974.

A remix of "The Code" by German DJ Felix Jaehn was released on 26 April 2024. An orchestral version of the song with accompaniment by the Biel Solothurn Symphony Orchestra was released on 10 May 2024, alongside a video where Nemo wears an outfit similar to the one worn by Canadian singer Céline Dion when she won the Eurovision Song Contest in 1988, also representing Switzerland.

== Critical reception ==
=== German and Swiss media and personalities ===
"The Code" has been largely well received. Michel Imhof, writer for Blick, wrote that the song was "an epic anthem that can be perfectly staged on stage... they can go really high. Nemo, I wish you lots of 12 points!" Tages-Anzeiger's Martin Fischer declared the song to be "spectacular... in these three minutes Nemo goes through all the genres that the musical talent masters.... Ballads always work at the contest, but other songs remain memorable. 'The Code' will be one of them." Schweizer Radio und Fernsehen's (SRF) Luca Koch described the song as "pompous", describing the song as "James Bond meet[ing] Hans Zimmer".

=== Eurovision-related and international media ===
In a Wiwibloggs review containing several reviews from several critics, the song was rated 8.83 out of 10 points, winning the site's annual ranking for that year. ESC Beat's Doron Lahav ranked the song eighth overall out of the 37 entries competing in Eurovision 2024, praising Nemo's vocal abilities but admitting that the song's subject matter and fusion of musical styles "might be too complicated to digest". Glen Weldon, writer for National Public Radio (NPR), deemed the song a favourite to win the contest, praising the blend of multiple styles within the song and declaring that it had "all the earmarks of a showstopper". The Independent's Roisin O'Connor also listed the song as a potential favourite, drawing comparisons to the Georges Bizet opera Carmen and the "James Bond Theme". Erin Adam of The Scotsman rated the song 10 out of 10, and dubbed it a "veritable smorgasbord of a song" due to its mix of styles. In contrast, Jon O'Brien, a writer for Vulture, ranked the song 22nd out of 37 songs, stating that while the song had a "great message of freedom, self-identity, and acceptance", he thought that "it gets lost in a cut-and-shut mix of drum and bass, pop opera, Eurorap, and The Greatest Showman that may leave you reaching for the Ibuprofen".

=== Betting odds ===
In the months heading into the Eurovision Song Contest 2024, "The Code" was considered one of the favourites to win the contest based on betting odds. Hours after the song was released, it was placed 10th on the first set of betting odds that were released after "The Code" came out. By 10 March, it increased to fourth place, threatening Italy's Angelina Mango for third. In the beginning of April, directly after Nemo's performance of the song in Pre-Party ES 2024, they increased to first, becoming the favourite to win the contest with 7-to-2 odds. Before rehearsals, "The Code" also had a 93% chance of qualifying from the second semi-final. In response to becoming the favourite, Nemo stated to Aussievision that they weren't "focus[ed] too much on [the odds]".

== Eurovision Song Contest ==
=== Internal selection ===
On 7 July 2023, the Swiss Broadcasting Corporation (SRG SSR) announced its intent to participate in the 68th edition of the Eurovision Song Contest, utilizing an internal selection to select their representative and song. Submissions for the Swiss bid occurred in two rounds: an initial jury round which was used to shortlist five candidates for another jury round. Initial rumours of Nemo being picked to represent Switzerland in Eurovision were reported on 25 February 2024 when Swiss news outlet Blick put out reports that they had been selected. Three days later, the song title was rumoured to be titled "The Code". On 29 February, they were officially announced to be Switzerland's representative for the contest.

=== At Eurovision ===
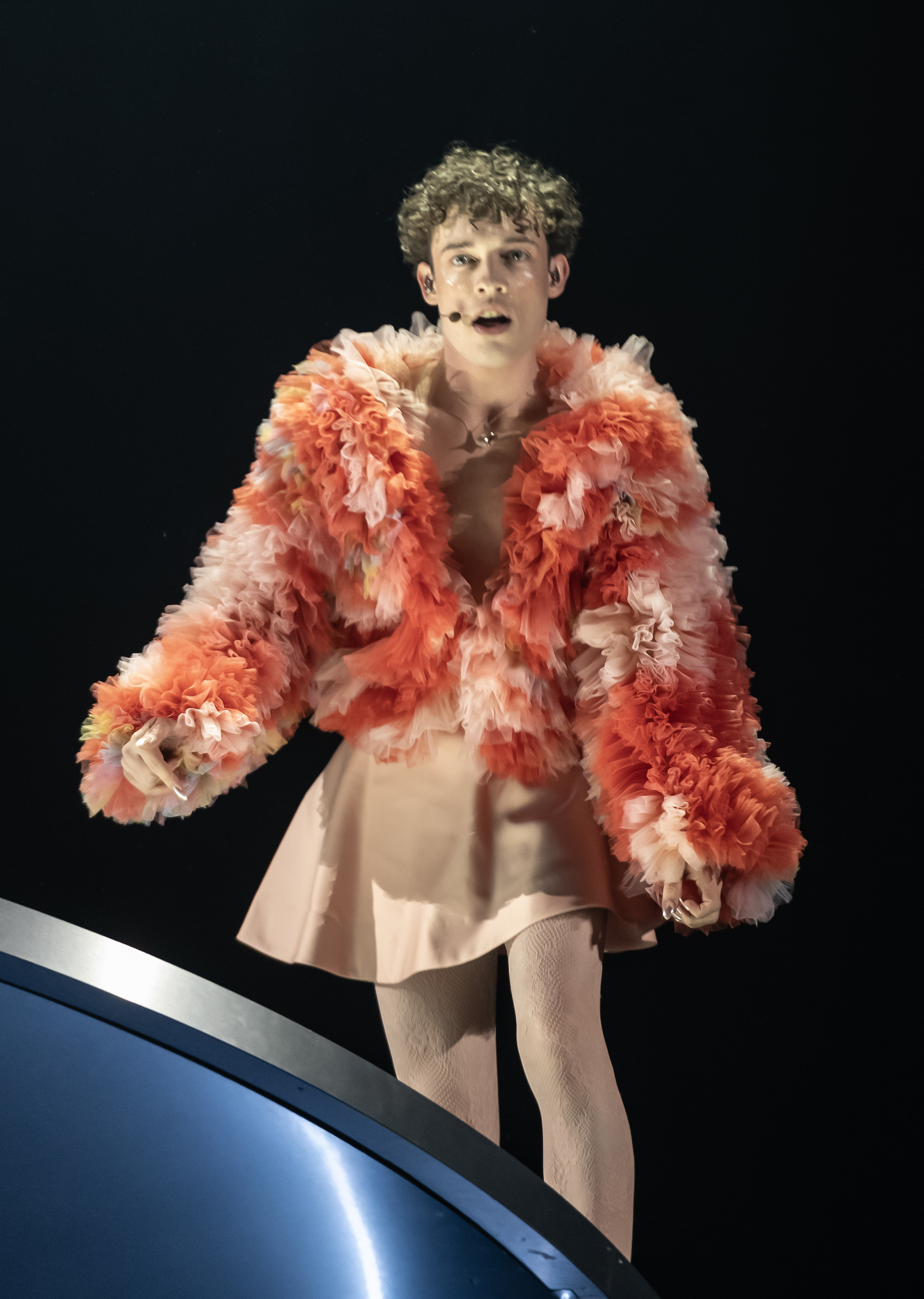
Nemo performing "The Code" at a dress rehearsal before the Eurovision 2024 grand final.

The Eurovision Song Contest 2024 took place at the Malmö Arena in Malmö, Sweden, and consisted of two semi-finals held on the respective dates of 7 and 9 May and the final on 11 May 2024. During the allocation draw on 30 January 2024, Switzerland was drawn to compete in the second semi-final, performing in the first half of the show. Nemo was later drawn to perform fourth in the semi-final, after Greece's Marina Satti and before Czechia's Aiko.

For their Eurovision performance, Swedish choreographer Fredrik Rydman was placed in charge of the staging. Nemo wore a pink and white fur suit designed by Malmö-based designer Linnea Samia Khalil, who had also designed the outfit Nemo wore for the "Turquoise Carpet". During the performance, Nemo is shown on a white circular prop, occasionally jumping on and off of it. According to Nemo, the prop was inspired by a small spinning top that they kept as a personal lucky charm. "The Code" finished in fourth, receiving 132 points and securing a spot in the grand final.

Nemo repeated their performance during the grand final on 11 May. The song was performed 21st, following Cyprus' Silia Kapsis and before Slovenia's Raiven. After the results were announced, Nemo finished with a total of 591 points, with a split result of 365 points from the juries and 226 points from the televote. The total was enough to earn Nemo the victory, earning 44 more points than the runner-up, Croatia's Baby Lasagna. The song received 22 sets of the maximum 12 points. It also received one set of 12 points from the televote, with it coming from Ukraine. As a result of winning, "The Code" become the first victorious song for Switzerland since 1988, with Nemo becoming the first openly non-binary artist to win the competition. In response to their victory, they declared in a post-contest press conference that they dedicated the win to "everyone out there who's non-binary, gender fluid, transgender... people that are daring to be themselves and people that need to be heard and need to be understood." Nemo also heavily criticised the European Broadcasting Union (EBU), the sanctioning body that manages the contest, accusing the EBU of "double standards", referencing an incident where Nemo claimed they had to smuggle a non-binary flag that breached the EBU's rules. Nemo later proclaimed, "maybe Eurovision needs fixing a little bit too, every now and then".

=== Reactions to performance and victory ===
The Eurovision performance received positive reactions. Daily Telegraph music critic Neil McCormick praised Nemo's vocals and "wild energy" during the performance, stating that although they thought the song lyrics were unusual, their energy "turned [the performance] into something transcendent in its own ridiculous way". Swiss musician Chris von Rohr stated that when he first listened to the live performance of the song, "its power almost knocked me over... The whole package has vehemence, dynamism, but also a lot of feeling in the singing in all registers." El Mundo writers Charlotte Davies and Andrea Rosa M. del Pino wrote that the performance featured "magical, circus-like vocal stunts, where they jump literally from high-pitched evokers to fast-paced rap verses as if it were nothing." In a Guardian live blog, Martin Belam wrote that the performance "has got winner written all over it. The song is brilliant, and the staging is a step up from everyone else in terms of presenting some kind of circus act drama on that stage." El País' Héctor Llanos Martínez described Nemo as a "force of nature", with the performance being described as "adjacent to the physical tricks performed on a disc-shaped moving platform, as if Mika had suddenly taken interest in parkour and skateboarding... they have done a presentation that has won over millions of this festival's viewers."

The victory received mixed, highly polarising reactions. GQ Italia's Valentina Caiani wrote that the victory "beat everybody's expectations... we have to admit that The Code had the potential to win, not only for the catchiness of the song, but also for the complexity of their performance and their choreography. Their strength relies on their message, which complies to the show's values and its slogan." Der Spiegel's Felix Bayer wrote that the victory upheld the "myth of the Eurovision Song Contest as a haven of creativity, openness and diversity." Die Weltwoche's Thomas Renggli wrote that "despite their choice of costume, which could have been improved, they kept their balance, both in terms of dance and music... in the end the musical quality prevailed." Katja Richard, writer for the Swiss outlet Blick, stated that the victory renewed discussions about the recognition of a third gender within Switzerland along with reinvigorating Swiss national pride. Numerous past Swiss Eurovision representatives, including 2019 representative Luca Hänni, 2020 and 2021 representative Gjon's Tears, and 2022 representative Marius Bear congratulated Nemo upon their victory.

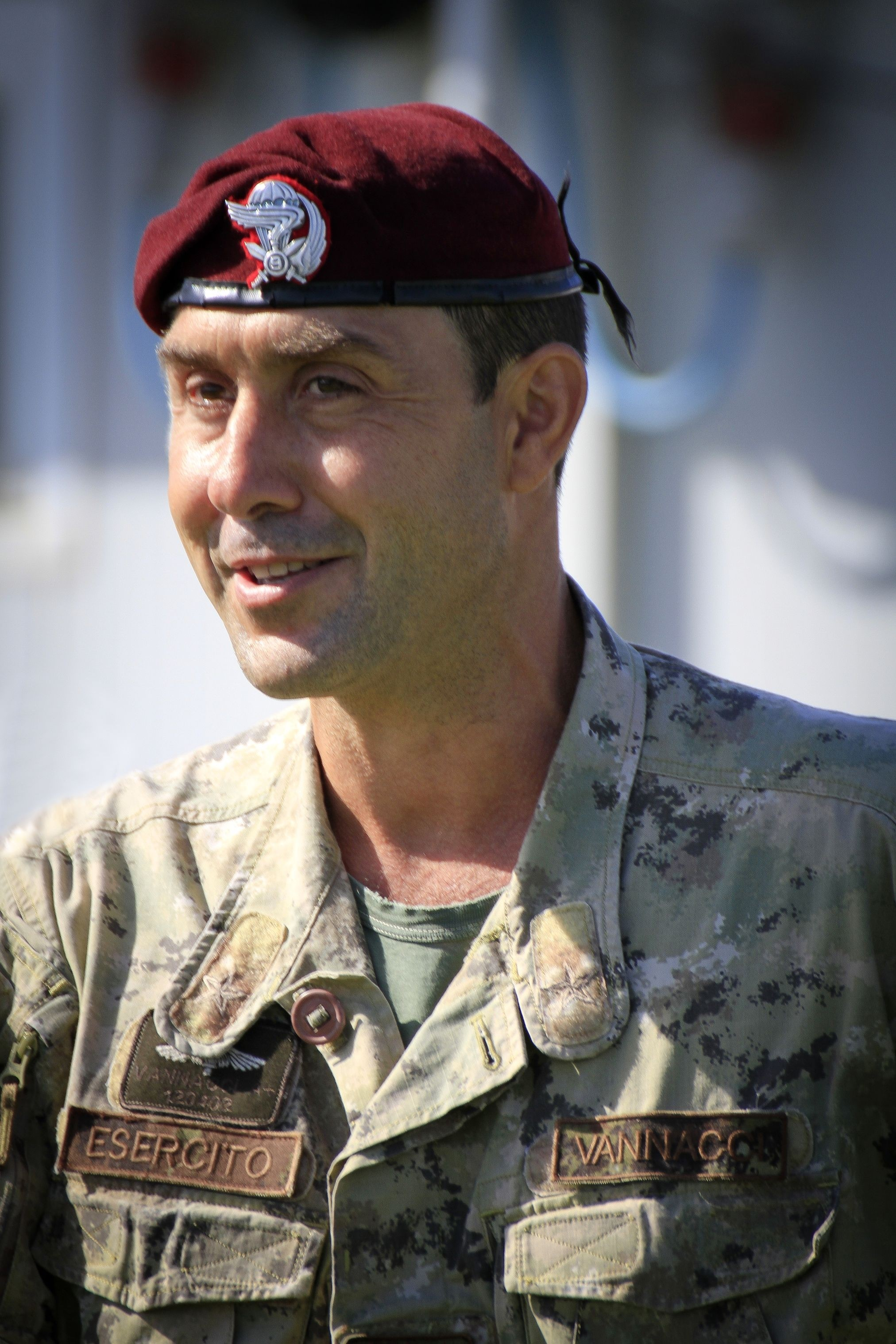
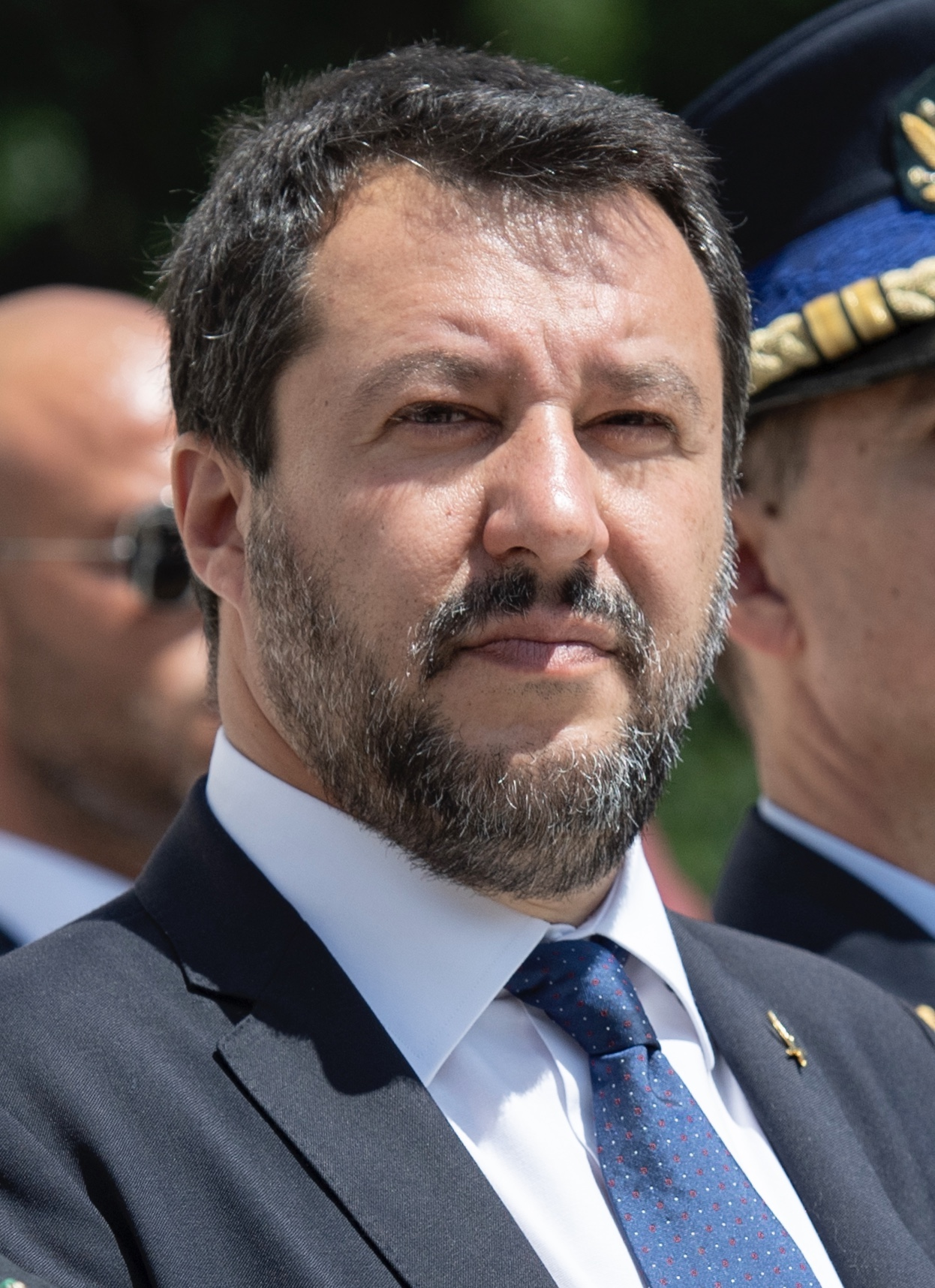
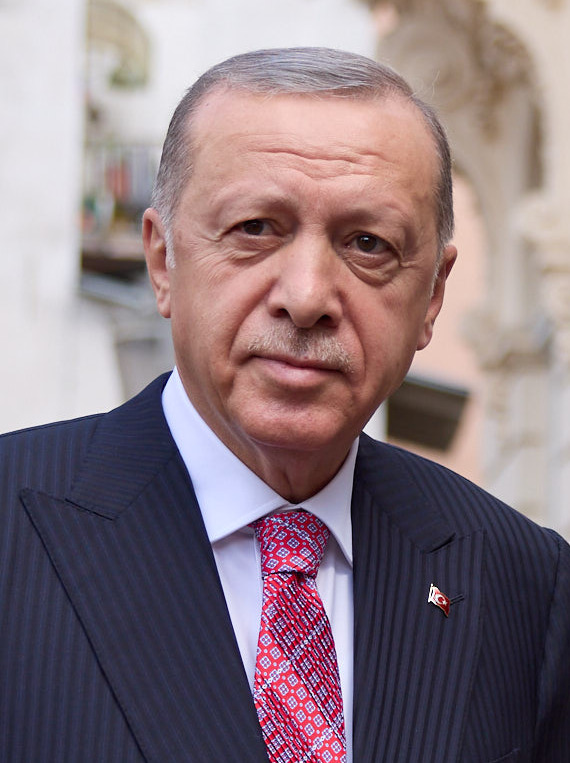
Numerous conservative personalities, including Italian politicians Roberto Vannacci (left) and Matteo Salvini (middle) alongside Turkish president Recep Tayyip Erdoğan (right) criticised the victory; particularly on Nemo's gender identity.

Multiple conservative personalities derided the victory, particularly due to Nemo's gender identity. Roberto Vannacci, a prominent conservative Italian politician, declared that "the world on the contrary is increasingly nauseating" in response to Nemo's victory and gender identity. Matteo Salvini, a current Italian Deputy Prime Minister, stated to Libero Quotidiano that "I read that this winner won, but you can't say... that you don't consider yourself either he or she, you consider yourself non-binary, you don't recognize yourself in considering yourself man-woman. You cannot say 'he won' or 'she won,' because otherwise you are ruined." Recep Tayyip Erdoğan, the current president of Turkey, indirectly referred to Nemo's victory to the contest and criticised Nemo and other Eurovision contestants for being "Trojan horses of social corruption", later adding, "we understand better how we made the right decision by keeping Türkiye out of this disgraceful competition for the past 12 years." Devlet Bahçeli, leader of the Turkish right-wing Nationalist Movement Party, stated that Nemo's dress they wore at the contest represented "confirmation of a shameful degeneration", adding that the contest had "turned into a propaganda platform for moral collapse." Timo Posselt, writer for Die Zeit, wrote that the victory was politically driven by the LGBTQ+ community, stating that Nemo was able to display a non-binary flag while other "politically charged materials", such as a keffiyeh and other non-binary flags brought in by the audience weren't allowed in the arena. Italian singer Amedeo Minghi stated that the contest now represented "Sodom and Gomorrah... a Swiss man in a skirt won, that's how it is now. Music, nothing. Lots of lights, lots of colors, music to see but certainly not to hear."

==== Opinions on overshadowing by Israeli participation ====
The song's victory was debated on whether or not it had been overshadowed by Israeli participation in that year's contest in the midst of the Gaza war, a major source of controversy. La Vanguardia's María-Paz López stated that the victory "saved the day thanks to a song and a performer so excellent and deserving of the prize that their victory could not be considered controversial." The same sentiment was shared by Davies and Rosa del Pino, who stated that the victory "was like a breath of fresh air for everyone after the most controversial and political edition of the contest's history". Süddeutsche Zeitung's Isabel Pfaff stated that the song was "a real balancing act... The contest has probably never been so [politically] charged... All the more fitting that in the end the only supposedly completely neutral country won – with a performance that itself demonstrated a great sense of balance." In contrast, i's Shaun Curran stated that despite Nemo's calls for the contest to "continue to stand for peace", the controversy and its fallout would continue to affect the contest. Vanity Fair Italia's Valentina Colosimo, while praising Nemo's victory, stated that despite the win, "to shatter the utopia of a world where love and tolerance reign, which is then the founding dream of Eurovision, it takes very little... Politics cannot stay out of music, even if it is good intentions for a better world that win out."

== Track listing ==
Digital download and streaming

1. "The Code" – 3:00

Digital download and streaming – remix

1. "The Code" (Felix Jaehn remix) – 3:18
2. "The Code" – 3:00

Digital download and streaming – orchestral version

1. "The Code" (orchestral version) – 3:07
2. "The Code" – 3:00

CD single

1. "The Code"
2. "The Code" (karaoke version)
3. "The Code" (Felix Jaehn remix)

== Awards and nominations ==
Awards and nominations for "The Code"
Year	Award	Category	Result	Ref.
2024	Marcel Bezençon Awards	Artistic Award	Won	
2024	Marcel Bezençon Awards	Composer Award	Won	
2024	OGAE	OGAE Poll	3rd	
2024	OUTmusic Awards	Eurovision Song of the Year	Won	
2024	Eurovision Awards	Best Music Video	Runner-up	
2025	Swiss Music Awards	Best Hit	Won	

== Charts ==
=== Weekly charts ===
Weekly chart performance for "The Code"
Chart (2024)	Peak position
Australia Digital Tracks (ARIA)	27
Austria (Ö3 Austria Top 40)	2
Belgium (Ultratop 50 Flanders)	15
Belgium (Ultratop 50 Wallonia)	49
Croatia (Billboard)	8
Croatia International Airplay (Top lista)	26
Czech Republic Singles Digital (ČNS IFPI)	25
Finland (Suomen virallinen lista)	5
France (SNEP)	92
Germany (GfK)	14
Global 200 (Billboard)	52
Greece International (IFPI)	1
Iceland (Tónlistinn)	9
Ireland (IRMA)	17
Israel (Mako Hitlist)	18
Italy (FIMI)	61
Latvia Streaming (LaIPA)	2
Lithuania (AGATA)	2
Luxembourg (Billboard)	5
Netherlands (Dutch Top 40)	37
Netherlands (Single Top 100)	13
New Zealand Hot Singles (RMNZ)	29
Norway (VG-lista)	13
Poland (Polish Streaming Top 100)	15
Portugal (AFP)	28
Slovakia Singles Digital (ČNS IFPI)	57
Spain (Promusicae)	40
Sweden (Sverigetopplistan)	5
Switzerland (Schweizer Hitparade)	1
UK Singles (Official Charts)	18
US Hot Dance/Electronic Songs (Billboard)	32

=== Year-end charts ===
Year-end chart performance for "The Code"
Chart (2024)	Position
Switzerland (Schweizer Hitparade)	37

== Certifications ==
Certifications for "The Code"
Region	Certification	Certified units/sales
Switzerland (IFPI Switzerland)	Platinum	30,000^{‡}
Streaming
Greece (IFPI Greece)	Platinum	2,000,000^{†}
^{‡} Sales+streaming figures based on certification alone.^{†} Streaming-only figures based on certification alone.

== Release history ==
Release history and formats for "The Code"
Region	Date	Format(s)	Version	Label	Ref.
Various	29 February 2024	Digital download; streaming	Original	Better Now; Universal	
Various	26 April 2024	Digital download; streaming	Felix Jaehn remix	Better Now; Universal	
Various	10 May 2024	Digital download; streaming	Orchestral	Better Now; Universal	
Various	10 May 2024	CD	Original; karaoke; Felix Jaehn remix	Better Now; Universal	
Italy	13 May 2024	Radio airplay	Original	EMI	

Preceded by "Tattoo" by Loreen	Eurovision Song Contest winners 2024	Succeeded by "Wasted Love" by JJ
