= Nemo (singer) =

Swiss singer (born 1999)

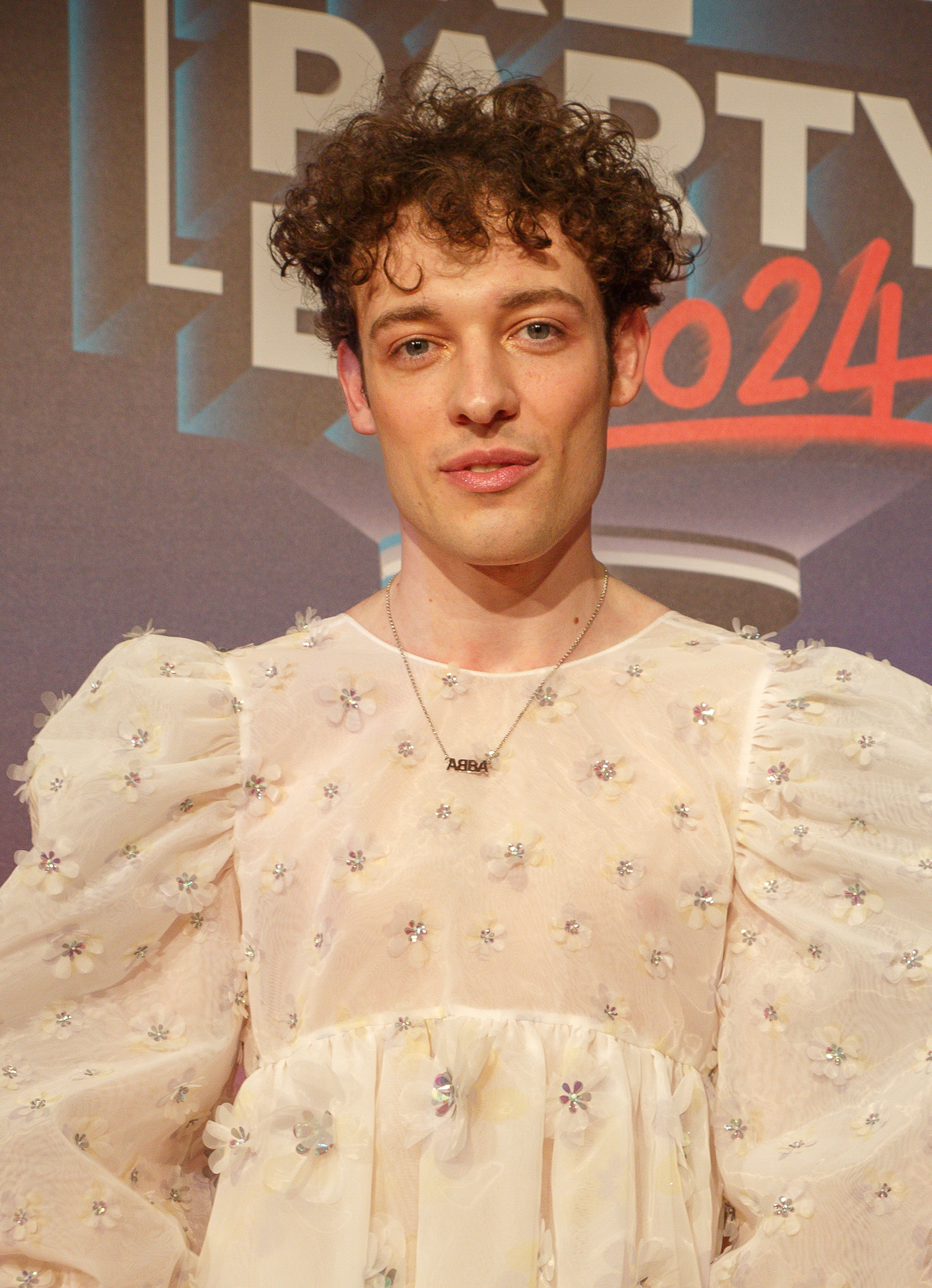
- Nemo in 2024

Background information
- Born: Nemo Mettler; 3 August 1999 (age 27); Biel, Canton of Bern, Switzerland
- Genres: Hip hop; pop
- Occupations: Singer; rapper
- Instruments: Vocals; violin; piano; drums
- Label: Bakara Music
- Website: nemothings.com

Nemo Mettler (Swiss Standard German: [ˈneːmo ˈmɛtlər]; born 3 August 1999), known mononymously as Nemo, is a Swiss musician and singer-rapper who plays the violin, piano and drums. They (Note: Mettler is non-binary and uses they/them pronouns.) were the first openly non-binary act to represent Switzerland in the Eurovision Song Contest, and later won the 2024 contest with the song "The Code". They were the first openly non-binary musician to win the contest, and the third winner representing Switzerland (following the 1956 and 1988 competitions).

== Career ==
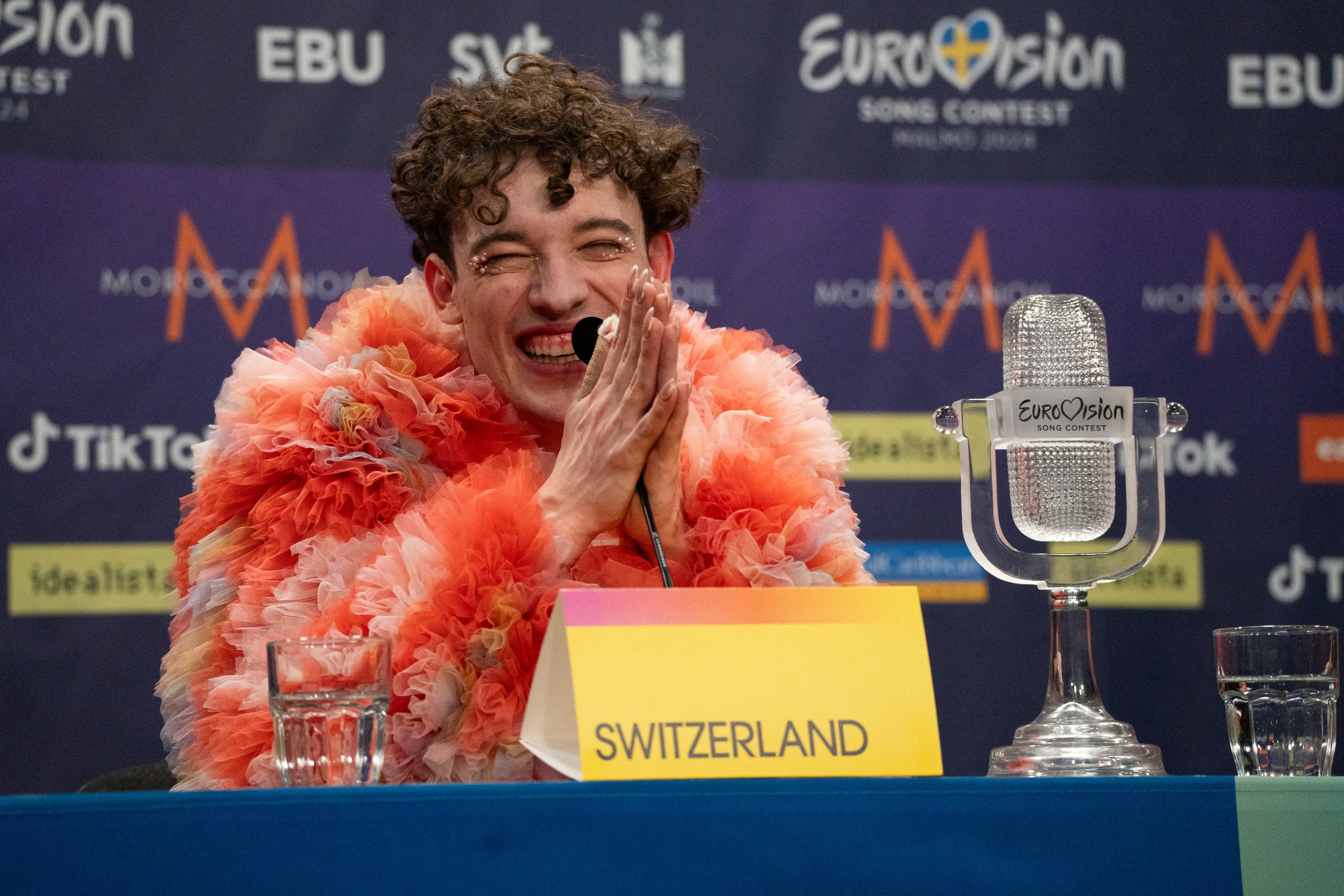
Nemo at the press conference following their Eurovision win in 2024

Mettler began their interest in music at the age of three, learning to play the violin, piano and drum machine. They studied opera singing from age nine to thirteen. At the age of ten, they joined the Biel children's opera and performed in Mozart's The Magic Flute which was later used as inspiration for "The Code". At thirteen, they performed in the musical I've Never Been to New York. They also began rapping at this age, competing in Swiss contests and performing songs they independently wrote. They found early success in battle rap as a teenager and performed on season three of the Swiss television show Die grössten Schweizer Talente, receiving praise from the judges.

In 2015, Mettler released their first EP Clownfisch, under the name Nemo (CH), which peaked at number 95 in the Swiss charts. In 2016, when they were seventeen, Mettler's single "Cypher" went viral. In 2017, they released the EPs Momänt-Kids and Fundbüro under the name Nemo (CH). Fundbüro contained the single "Du", which reached number 4 in Switzerland. "Ke Bock" and "Himalaya" also charted. In the same year they studied solo singing in jazz and pop at Zurich University of the Arts, won the SRF 3 Best Talent prize, and later settled in Berlin to pursue their music career. In 2018, Mettler won four Swiss Music Prizes, including best song of the year for Du and best concert performance of the year.

After staying in Los Angeles in 2020, Mettler decided to switch from singing in Swiss German to English. On the second season of The Masked Singer Switzerland in 2021, they were unmasked as a panda and finished in fifth place. In 2022, they released their EP Whatever Feels Right, this time under the name Nemo. On 29 February 2024, they were announced as the Swiss representative in the Eurovision Song Contest 2024 with the song "The Code", and performed in the second semi-final of the contest, on 9 May. They won the Eurovision final on 11 May with 591 points, becoming the first openly non-binary performer to win the contest; they also finished with the fourth highest amount of points in the final in the competition's history.

== Personal life ==
Nemo Mettler was born in Biel/Bienne in the canton of Bern. Their father, Markus Mettler, is an entrepreneur and inventor, and mother, Nadja Schnetzler, a journalist. Nemo's sister, Ella, is a photographer. She collaborates with Nemo in the artistic direction of their projects. Nemo's first name means 'no one' in Latin. During a mission for the Swiss Red Cross in El Salvador in 2018, they said "my parents thought that if I was no-one, I could become anyone."

In 2022, Mettler came out as pansexual via an Instagram story, and as of 2024, they have been in a five-year relationship with their girlfriend, who was the first person they came out as non-binary to.

In November 2023, Mettler publicly came out as non-binary in an article in the SonntagsZeitung, after being closeted since around 2021. In the article, Mettler also stated that they prefer to be referred to by their given name, Nemo, instead of pronouns in German, and by they/them pronouns in English.

From 2021 to 2024, Mettler lived in Berlin, then moved to London. Since July 2025, Mettler has been living in Paris.

=== Activism ===
Following their Eurovision win, Mettler called on the Swiss government to legally recognise a third gender, after this proposal was rejected in 2022. When asked in an interview who they would call first after their win, they responded with Beat Jans, Switzerland's justice minister, stating that "we need to have the representation in our politics". A spokesperson for Jans later stated that the minister had responded and was willing to meet Nemo to discuss the rights of non-binary people in Switzerland. In response to the topic, Green Party member of the National Council Sibel Arslan wrote on social media that "a non-binary person who officially doesn't exist in Switzerland has won Eurovision 2024", and that the matter was "more relevant than ever", urging the Federal Council to act.

Due to the continuing Gaza war, Nemo called for Israel to be excluded from the Eurovision Song Contest 2025. In May 2025, Nemo stated that "Israel’s actions are fundamentally at odds with the values that Eurovision claims to uphold — peace, unity, and respect for human rights." In December 2025, Mettler announced they were returning their Eurovision trophy because of Israel's continued inclusion. They clarified the decision, stating "this is not about individuals or artists. The contest has been repeatedly used as a tool to soften the image of a state accused of severe wrongdoing, all while the EBU insists that Eurovision is 'non-political.'"

== Discography ==
=== Studio albums ===
List of albums, with selected details
Title	Details	Peak chart positions	
Title	Details	SWI	GER
Arthouse	Released: 10 October 2025; Label: Better Now; Formats: Digital download, streaming	3	95

=== Extended plays ===
List of EPs, with selected details
Title	Details	Peak chart positions
Title	Details	SWI
Clownfisch	Released: 13 June 2015; Label: Self-released; Formats: Digital download, streaming	95
Momänt-Kids	Released: 21 October 2017; Label: Bakara Music; Formats: Digital download, streaming	—
Fundbüro	Released: 17 November 2017; Label: Bakara Music; Formats: Digital download, streaming	—
Whatever Feels Right	Released: 9 September 2022; Label: Self-released; Formats: Digital download, streaming	—
"—" denotes a recording that did not chart or was not released in that territory.

=== Singles ===
==== As lead artist ====
Title	Year	Peak chart positions										Certifications	Album or EP
Title	Year	SWI	FIN	GER	IRE	ITA	NLD	NOR	SWE	UK	WW	Certifications	Album or EP
"Himalaya"	2016	27	—	—	—	—	—	—	—	—	—		Momänt-Kids
"Style" (with Marc Amacher)	2017	—	—	—	—	—	—	—	—	—	—		Non-album single
"Du"	2017	4	—	—	—	—	—	—	—	—	—	IFPI SWI: Platinum	Fundbüro
"Usserirdisch"	2017	64	—	—	—	—	—	—	—	—	—		Fundbüro
"Crush uf di"	2018	77	—	—	—	—	—	—	—	—	—		Non-album singles
"5i uf de Uhr"	2019	31	—	—	—	—	—	—	—	—	—		Non-album singles
"365"	2019	—	—	—	—	—	—	—	—	—	—		Non-album singles
"Girl us mire City"	2019	—	—	—	—	—	—	—	—	—	—		Non-album singles
"Dance with Me"	2020	—	—	—	—	—	—	—	—	—	—		Non-album singles
"Video Games"	2020	—	—	—	—	—	—	—	—	—	—		Non-album singles
"Hailey" (with Chelan)	2021	—	—	—	—	—	—	—	—	—	—		Orange & Blue
"Certified Pop Queen"	2021	—	—	—	—	—	—	—	—	—	—		Non-album singles
"Chleiderchäschtli" (with KT Gorique)	2021	—	—	—	—	—	—	—	—	—	—		Non-album singles
"Lonely AF"	2022	—	—	—	—	—	—	—	—	—	—		Whatever Feels Right
"Own Sh¡t"	2022	—	—	—	—	—	—	—	—	—	—		Whatever Feels Right
"F*ck Love" (with Anthony de la Torre)	2022	—	—	—	—	—	—	—	—	—	—		Whatever Feels Right
"Be like You"	2022	—	—	—	—	—	—	—	—	—	—		Whatever Feels Right
"This Body"	2023	—	—	—	—	—	—	—	—	—	—		Non-album singles
"Falling Again"	2024	—	—	—	—	—	—	—	—	—	—		Non-album singles
"The Code"	2024	1	3	14	5	61	13	13	5	18	52	IFPI SWI: Platinum	Arthouse
"Eurostar"	2024	54	—	—	—	—	—	—	—	—	—		Arthouse
"Satellite" (Note: Released exclusively as a Spotify single.)	2025	—	—	—	—	—	—	—	—	—	—		Non-album single
"Casanova"	2025	— (Note: "Casanova" did not enter the Swiss Singles Chart, but peaked at No. 2 on the Swiss Artist Single Charts Top 10.)	—	—	—	—	—	—	—	—	—		Arthouse
"Unexplainable"	2025	— (Note: "Unexplainable" did not enter the Swiss Singles Chart, but peaked at No. 3 on the Swiss Artist Single Charts Top 10.)	—	—	—	—	—	—	—	—	—		Arthouse
"God's a Raver"	2025	—	—	—	—	—	—	—	—	—	—		Arthouse
"Hocus Pocus"	2025	—	—	—	—	—	—	—	—	—	—		Arthouse
"—" denotes a recording that did not chart or was not released in that territory.

==== As featured artist ====
Title	Year	Album or EP
"Sheriff" (Visu featuring Nemo)	2016	Sex & Röschti
"Singer" (Dodo featuring Nemo)	2017	Pfingstweid
"Legend" (Stress featuring Nemo)	2019	Sincèrement
"Walk Away" (Pablo Nouvelle featuring Nemo)	2025	2025

=== Other charted songs ===
Title	Year	Peak chart positions	Certifications	Album or EP
Title	Year	SWI	Certifications	Album or EP
"Ke bock"	2017	31	IFPI SWI: Gold	Momänt-Kids
"Kunstwärch"	2017	90		Fundbüro

== Awards and achievements ==
Year	Award	Category	Nominee(s)	Result	Ref.
2017	Energy Star Night	Energy Music Award	Themself	Won	
2017	Prix Walo	Best Newcomer	Themself	Won	
2017	Swiss Music Awards	Best Talent	Themself	Won	
2018	Swiss Music Awards	Best Male Solo Act	Themself	Won	
2018	Swiss Music Awards	Best Breaking Act	Themself	Won	
2018	Swiss Music Awards	Best Live Act	Themself	Won	
2018	Swiss Music Awards	Best Hit	"Du"	Won	
2024	OUTmusic Award	Eurovision Song of the Year	"The Code"	Won	
2024	Eurostory Award	Best Lyrics	"The Code"	Won	
2024	MTV Europe Music Awards	Best Swiss Act	Themself	Won	
2024	Eurovision Awards	Best Artistic Vision	Themself	Nominated	
2024	Eurovision Awards	Vocal Powerhouse Award	Themself	Won	
2024	Eurovision Awards	Style Icon	Themself	Runner-up	
2024	Eurovision Awards	Best Music Video	"The Code"	Runner-up	
2024	Virgin Atlantic Attitude Awards	Person of the Year	Themself	Won	
2025	Swiss Music Awards	Best National Solo Act	Themself	Won	
2025	Swiss Music Awards	Best Streaming Artist	Themself	Nominated	
2025	Swiss Music Awards	Most Rising Artist on Social Media	Themself	Nominated	
2025	Swiss Music Awards	Best Hit	"The Code"	Won	
2026	Swiss Music Awards	Best National Solo Act	Themself	Nominated	

== Notes ==
Awards and achievements
Preceded by Remo Forrer with "Watergun"	Switzerland in the Eurovision Song Contest; 2024	Succeeded by Zoë Më with "Voyage"
Preceded by (Sweden) Loreen with "Tattoo"	Winner of the Eurovision Song Contest; 2024	Succeeded by (Austria) JJ with "Wasted Love"
