= Mata Hari =

Dutch exotic dancer (1876–1917)

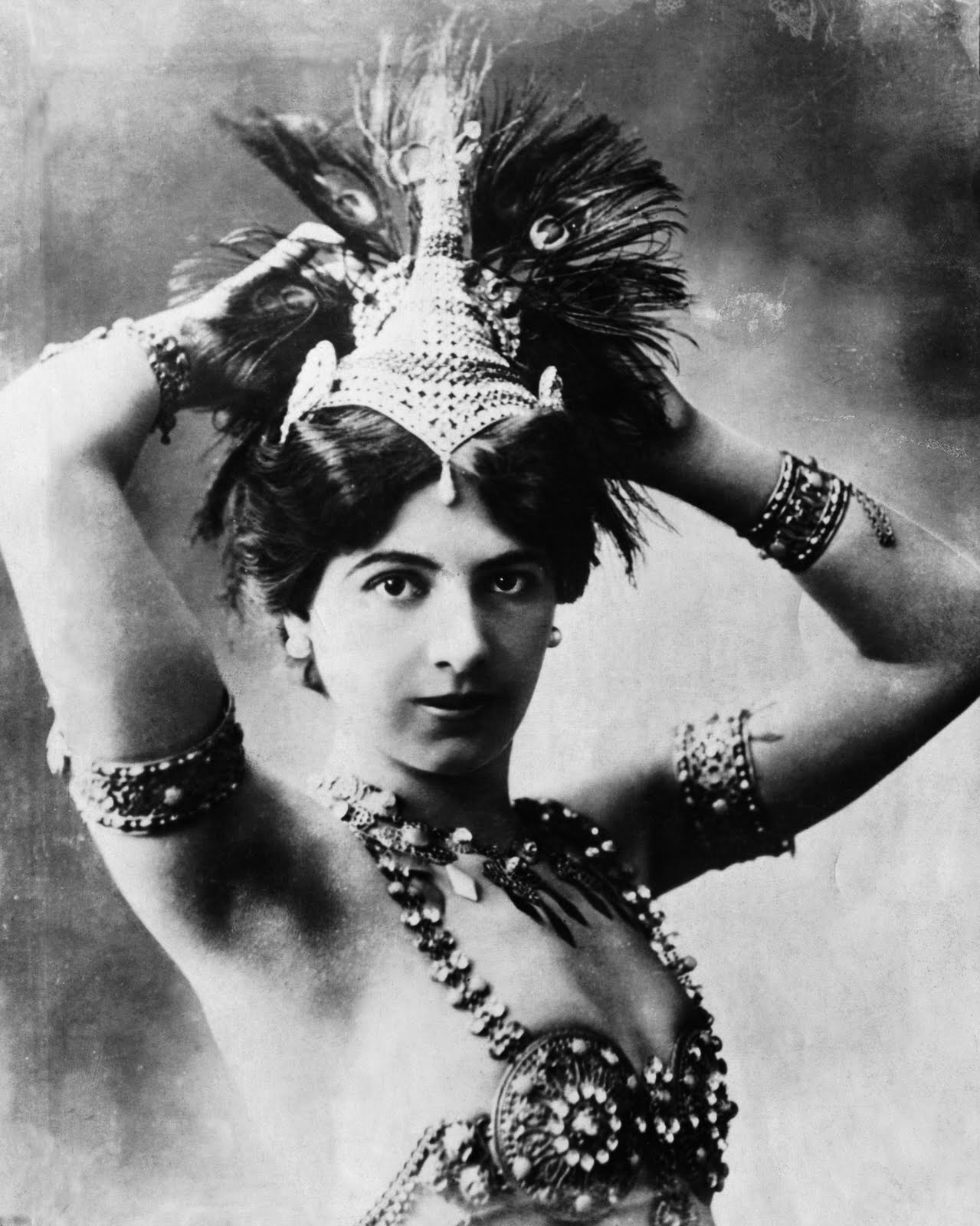
- Mata Hari, c. 1910
- Born: Margaretha Geertruida Zelle; 7 August 1876; Leeuwarden, Netherlands
- Died: 15 October 1917 (aged 41); Vincennes, France
- Cause of death: Execution by firing squad
- Occupations: Exotic dancer; courtesan
- Spouse: Rudolf John MacLeod (m. 1895; div. 1906)
- Children: 2
- Espionage activity
- Allegiance: France; German Empire
- Service branch: Deuxième Bureau
- Service years: 1916–1917

Margaretha Geertruida MacLeod (née Zelle, Dutch: [mɑrɣaːˈreːtaː ɣeːrˈtrœydaː ˈzɛlə]; 7 August 1876 – 15 October 1917), better known by the stage name Mata Hari (/ˈmɑːtə ˈhɑːri/ MAH-tə HAR-ee, Dutch: [ˈmaːtaː ˈɦaːri]; Indonesian for 'sun', lit. 'eye of the day'), was a Dutch exotic dancer and courtesan who was convicted of being a spy for Germany during World War I. She was executed by firing squad in France.

The idea of a beautiful exotic dancer using her powers of seduction as a spy made her name synonymous with the femme fatale. Mata Hari's story has inspired books, films, and other works. Later biographers argue that she was convicted and condemned because the French Army needed a scapegoat, and that the files used to secure her conviction contained falsifications. Some have even stated that she could not have been a spy and was innocent.

== Early life ==
Margaretha Geertruida Zelle was born on 7 August 1876 in Leeuwarden, a city in the north of the Netherlands, to Antje van der Meulen (1842–1891) and her husband, Adam Zelle (1840–1910). She had three younger brothers: Johannes Hendriks, Arie Anne, and Cornelis Coenraad. She was affectionately called "M'greet" by her family. Despite traditional assertions that Mata Hari was partly of Jewish, Malay, or Javanese, i.e., Indonesian, descent, scholars conclude she had no Jewish or Indonesian ancestry, and both of her parents were Dutch. Her father owned a hat factory and shop, made investments in the oil industry, and became affluent enough to give Margaretha and her siblings a lavish early childhood that included exclusive schools until the age of 13.

Soon after Zelle's father went bankrupt in 1889, her parents divorced, and her mother died in 1891. Her father remarried in Amsterdam on 9 February 1893 to Susanna Catharina ten Hoove (1844–1913). The family fell apart, and Zelle was sent to live with her godfather, Mr. Visser, in Sneek. She studied to be a kindergarten teacher in Leiden, but when the headmaster began to flirt with her conspicuously, she was removed from the institution by her godfather. A few months later, she fled to her uncle's home in The Hague.

== Dutch East Indies ==
At 18, Zelle answered an advertisement in a Dutch newspaper placed by Dutch colonial army captain Rudolf MacLeod (1856–1928), who was living in the Dutch East Indies (later Indonesia) and was looking for a wife. Zelle married MacLeod in Amsterdam on 11 July 1895. He was the son of Captain John Brienen MacLeod (a descendant of the Gesto branch of the MacLeods of Skye, hence his Scottish surname) and his wife Baroness Dina Louisa Sweerts de Landas. The marriage enabled Zelle to move into the Dutch upper class and placed her finances on a sound footing. She moved with her husband to Malang on the east side of the island of Java, travelling out on the SS Prinses Amalia in May 1897. They had two children, Norman-John MacLeod (1897–1899) and Louise Jeanne MacLeod (1898–1919).

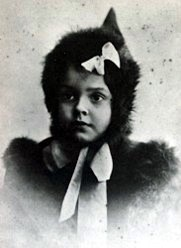
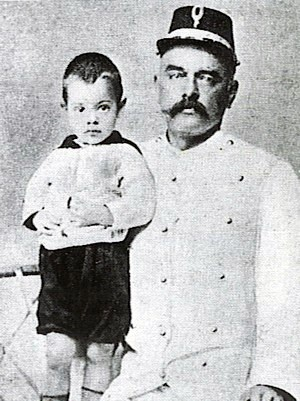
Her children, Louise Jeanne (left), and Norman-John with his father

The marriage was overall a disappointment. MacLeod was an alcoholic, physically abused Zelle, and blamed her for his lack of promotion. He openly kept a concubine, a socially accepted practice in the Dutch East Indies at the time. When Rudolf was posted to Medan, Zelle and the children remained in Toempoeng with the family of Mr. van Rheede, the government comptroller. Friends of Zelle's in the Netherlands recall her writing to them around this time to say that she had taken the name Mata Hari, the word for "sun" in the local Indonesian language (literally, "eye of the day").

At MacLeod's urging, Zelle returned to him, but his behavior did not change. In 1899, their children fell violently ill from complications relating to the treatment of syphilis contracted from their parents, though the family claimed an irate servant poisoned them. Jeanne survived, but Norman died. Some sources maintain that one of MacLeod's enemies may have poisoned their supper to kill both of their children. After moving back to the Netherlands, the couple officially separated on 30 August 1902. The divorce became final in 1906, and Zelle was awarded custody of Jeanne. MacLeod was legally required to pay child support but never did. Once when Jeanne visited Rudolf, he did not return her to her mother. Zelle did not have the resources to fight the situation and accepted it, believing that while Rudolf had been an abusive husband, he had been a good father. Jeanne later died at the age of 21, possibly from complications related to syphilis.

== Career ==
=== Paris ===
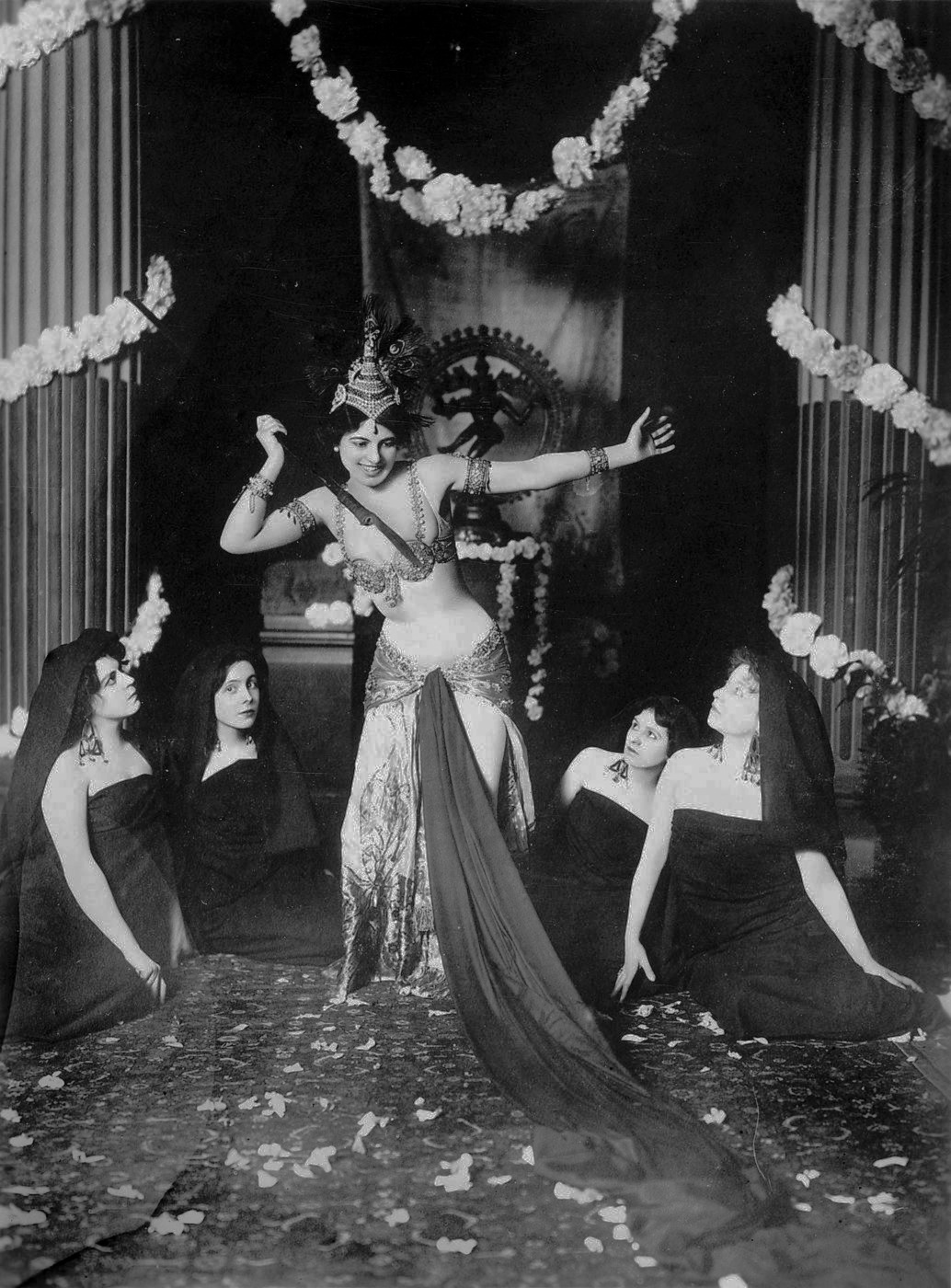
Mata Hari performing in 1905

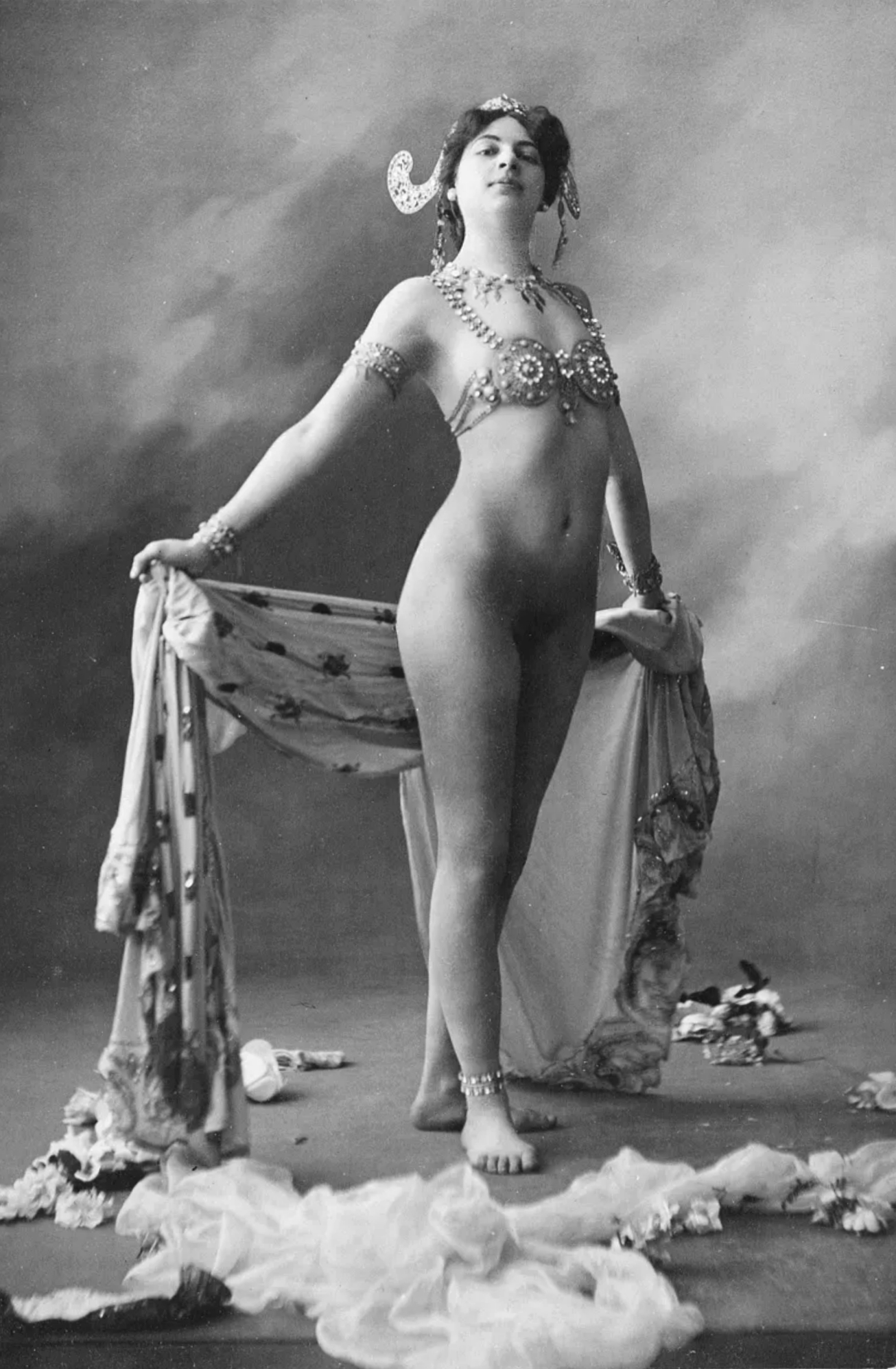
Mata Hari in 1906, wearing only a gold jeweled breastplate and jewelry

In 1903, Zelle moved to Paris, where she performed as a circus horse rider using the name Lady MacLeod, much to the disapproval of the Dutch MacLeods. Struggling to earn a living, she also posed as an artist's model.

By 1904, Mata Hari rose to prominence as an exotic dancer. She was a contemporary of dancers Isadora Duncan and Ruth St. Denis, leaders in the early modern dance movement, which around the turn of the 20th century, looked to Asia and Egypt for artistic inspiration. Gabriel Astruc became her personal booking agent.

Promiscuous, flirtatious, and openly flaunting her body, Mata Hari captivated her audiences and was an overnight success from the debut of her act at the Musée Guimet on 13 March 1905. She became the long-time mistress of the millionaire industrialist Émile Étienne Guimet, who had founded the Musée. Entertainers of her era commonly invented colourful stories about their origins, and she posed as a Javanese princess of priestly Hindu birth, pretending to have been immersed in the art of sacred Indian dance since childhood. She was photographed numerous times during this period, nude or nearly so. Some of these pictures were obtained by MacLeod and strengthened his case in keeping custody of their daughter.

Mata Hari brought a carefree provocative style to the stage in her act, which garnered wide acclaim. The most celebrated segment of her act was her progressive shedding of clothing until she wore just a jeweled breastplate and some ornaments upon her arms and head. She was never seen bare-chested. Early in her career, she wore for her performances a bodystocking that was similar in color to her skin, but that was later omitted.

Her act was successful because it elevated erotic dance to a more respectable status and broke new ground in a style of entertainment for which Paris was later world famous. Her style and free-willed attitude made her popular, as did her eagerness to perform in exotic and revealing clothing. She posed for provocative photos and mingled in wealthy circles. Since most Europeans at the time were unfamiliar with the Dutch East Indies, Mata Hari was thought of as exotic, and her claims were accepted as genuine. One enthusiastic French journalist wrote in a Paris newspaper that Mata Hari was "so feline, extremely feminine, majestically tragic, the thousand curves and movements of her body trembling in a thousand rhythms." One journalist in Vienna wrote after seeing one of her performances that Mata Hari was "slender and tall with the flexible grace of a wild animal, and with blue-black hair" and that her face "makes a strange foreign impression."

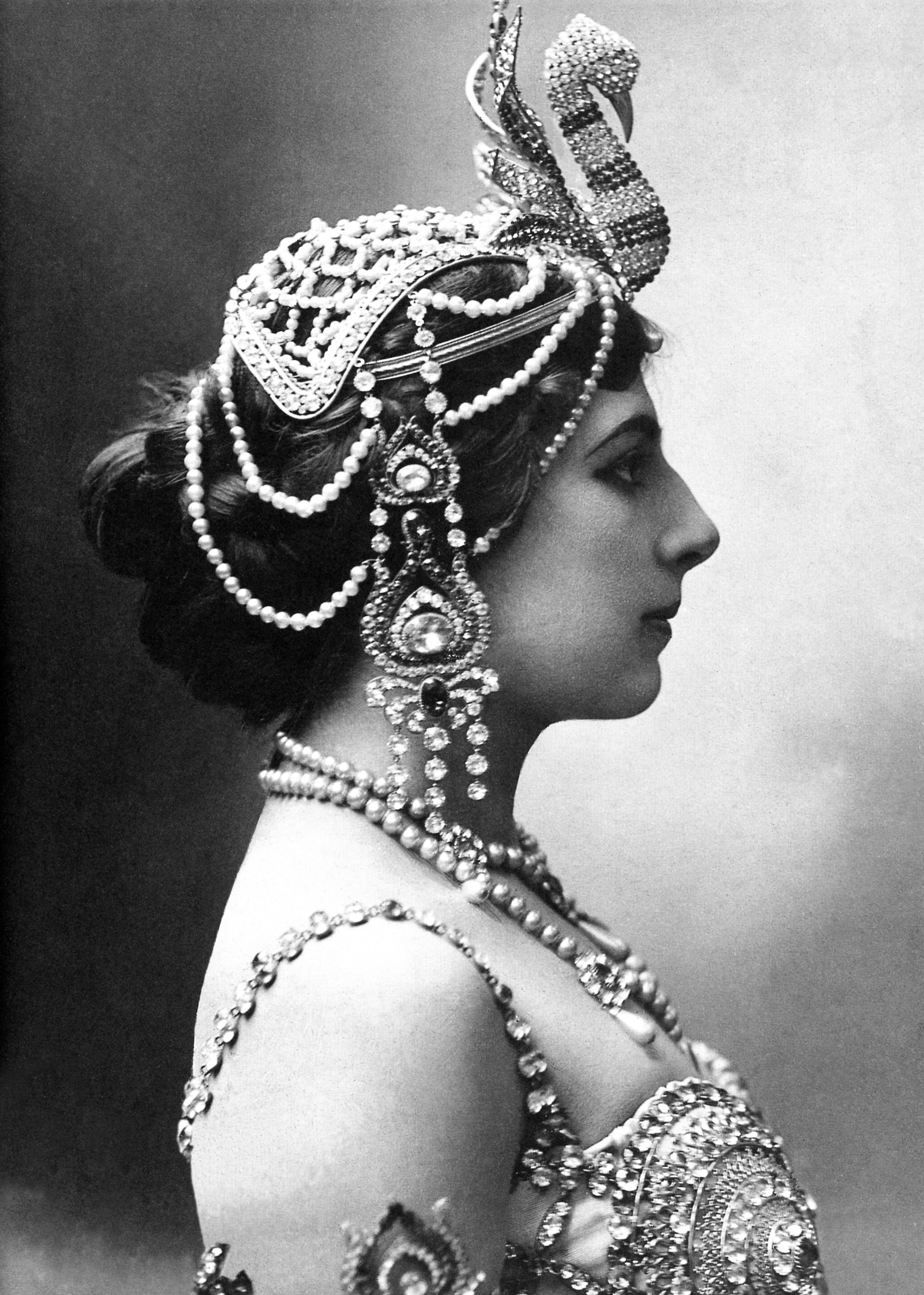
Mata Hari in 1910 wearing a jeweled head-dress

By about 1910, myriad imitators had arisen. Critics began to opine that the success and dazzling features of the popular Mata Hari were due to cheap exhibitionism and lacked artistic merit. Although she continued to schedule important social events throughout Europe, she was disdained by serious cultural institutions as a dancer who did not know how to dance.

Mata Hari's career went into decline after 1912. On 13 March 1915, she performed in the last show of her career. She had begun her career relatively late as a dancer and had started putting on weight. However, by this time, she had become a successful courtesan, known more for her sensuality and eroticism than for her classical beauty. She had relationships with high-ranking military officers, politicians, and others in influential positions in many countries. Her relationships and liaisons with powerful men frequently took her across international borders. Before World War I, she was generally viewed as an artist and a free-spirited bohemian, but as war approached, she began to be seen by some as a wanton and promiscuous woman, and perhaps a dangerous seductress.

== Espionage ==
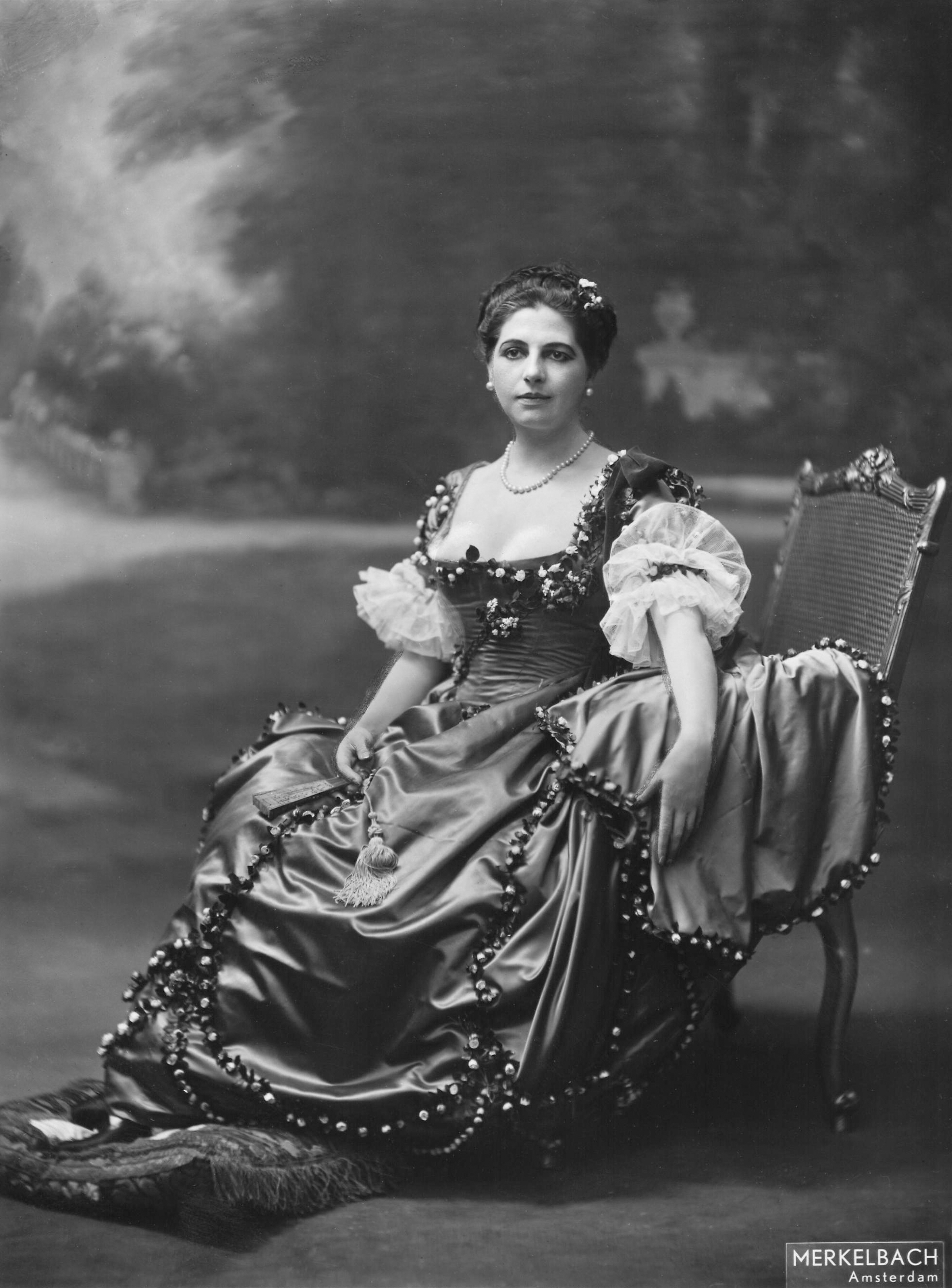
Zelle photographed in Amsterdam, 1915

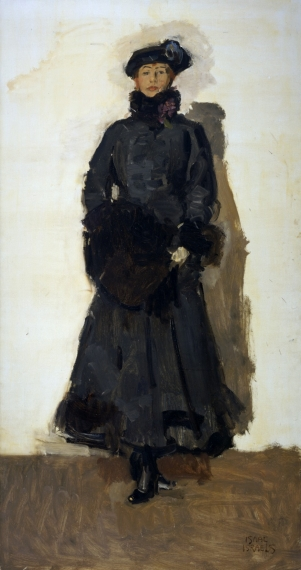
Painting of Mata Hari by Isaac Israëls, 1916

During World War I, the Netherlands remained neutral. As a Dutch subject, Zelle was thus able to cross national borders freely. To avoid the battlefields, she traveled between France and the Netherlands via Spain and Britain, and her movements inevitably attracted attention. During the war, Zelle was involved in what was described as a very intense romantic-sexual relationship with Captain Vadim Maslov, a 23-year-old Russian staff captain of the 1st Special Infantry Regiment serving with the French, whom she called the love of her life. Maslov was part of the 50,000-strong Russian Expeditionary Force sent to the Western Front in the spring of 1916.

In April 1916, Maslov was wounded fighting in the ill-fated Nivelles Offensive to capture the German controlled fortified Brimont mountain range, losing the sight in his left eye, leading Zelle to ask for permission to visit her wounded lover who was being treated at a hospital near the front. As a citizen of a neutral country, Zelle would not normally be allowed near the front. Zelle was met by agents from the Deuxième Bureau, who told her that she would be allowed to see Maslov if she agreed to spy for France.

Before the war, Zelle had performed as Mata Hari several times before the Crown Prince Wilhelm, eldest son of Kaiser Wilhelm II and nominally a senior German general on the Western Front. The Deuxième Bureau believed she could obtain information by seducing the Crown Prince for military secrets. In fact, his involvement was minimal, and it was German government propaganda that promoted the image of the Crown Prince as a great warrior, the worthy successor to the Hohenzollern monarchs who had made Prussia strong and powerful. They wanted to avoid publicising that the man expected to be the next Kaiser was a playboy noted for womanising, partying, and indulging in alcohol, who spent a portion of his time associating with right-learning politicians, with the intent to have his father declared insane and deposed.

Unaware that the Crown Prince did not have much to do with the running of Army Group Crown Prince or the 5th Army, the Deuxième Bureau offered Zelle one million francs if she could seduce him and provide France with good intelligence about German plans. Zelle's contact with the Deuxième Bureau was Captain Georges Ladoux, who later emerged as one of her principal accusers.

In November 1916, she was traveling from Spain aboard the steamship Zeelandia, and when the ship called at the British port of Falmouth in Cornwall, she was arrested and taken to London, where she was interrogated at length by Assistant Commissioner Sir Basil Thomson of the Metropolitan Police. Sir Basil was based at New Scotland Yard and in charge of counter-espionage. He gave an account of this in his 1922 book Queer People, saying that she eventually admitted to working for the Deuxième Bureau. Initially detained in Canon Row police station, she was then released and stayed at the Savoy Hotel. A full transcript of the interview is in Britain's National Archives at Kew and was broadcast, with Mata Hari played by Eleanor Bron, on the independent radio station LBC in 1980. It is unclear if she lied on this occasion, believing the story made her sound more intriguing, or if the French authorities were using her in such a way but would not acknowledge her due to the embarrassment and international backlash it could cause.

In late 1916, Zelle traveled to Madrid, where she met the German military attaché Major Arnold Kalle and asked if he could arrange a meeting with the German Crown Prince. During this period, Zelle apparently offered to share French secrets with the German Empire in exchange for money, though whether this was because of greed or an attempt to set up a meeting with Crown Prince Wilhelm remains unclear.

In January 1917, Kalle transmitted radio messages to Berlin describing the helpful activities of a German spy code-named H-21, whose biography so closely matched Zelle's that it was obvious they were one and the same. The Deuxième Bureau intercepted the messages, and from the information contained within they identified H-21 as Mata Hari. The messages were in a code that German intelligence knew had already been broken by the French, suggesting that the messages were contrived to have Zelle arrested by the French.

General Walter Nicolai, the chief intelligence officer of the German Imperial Army, had grown annoyed that Mata Hari had provided no real intelligence, instead selling the Germans mere Paris gossip about the sex lives of French politicians and generals, and decided to terminate her employment by exposing her as a German spy to the French.

=== Trial ===
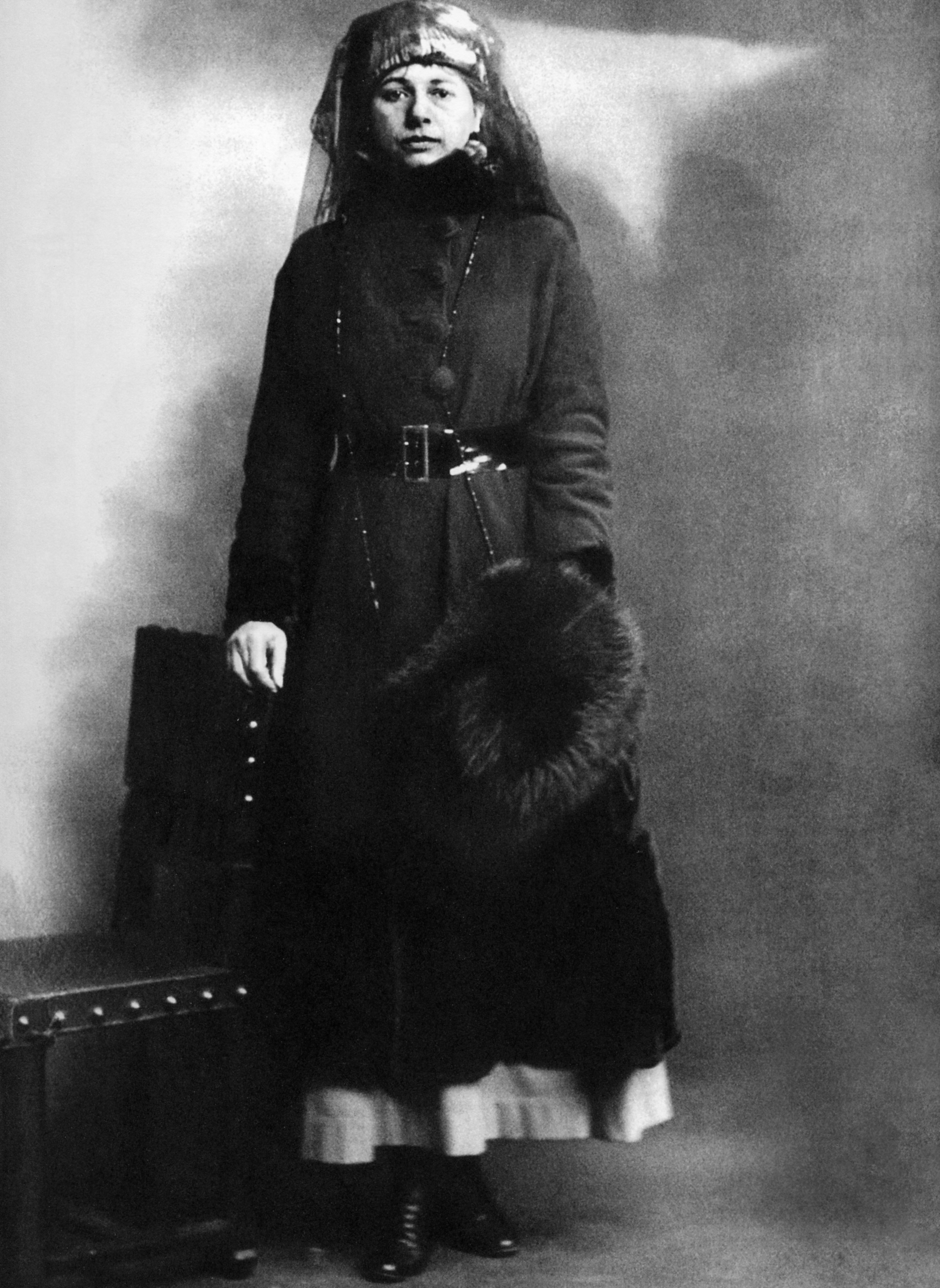
Mata Hari on the day of her arrest

In December 1916, the Deuxième Bureau of the French War Ministry let Mata Hari obtain the names of six Belgian agents. Five were suspected of submitting fake material and working for the Germans, while the sixth was suspected of being a double agent for Germany and France. Two weeks after Mata Hari left Paris for a trip to Madrid, the Germans executed the double agent while the five others continued their operations. This development proved to the Deuxième Bureau that Mata Hari had communicated the names of the six spies to the Germans.

On 13 February 1917, Mata Hari was arrested in her room at the Hotel Elysée Palace on the Champs Elysées in central Paris. She was tried on 24 July, accused of spying for Germany and consequently causing the deaths of at least 50,000 soldiers. Although the French and British intelligence services suspected her of spying for Germany, neither could produce definite evidence against her.

A harlot? Yes, but a traitoress, never!

— Phrase attributed to Mata Hari during the trial

Zelle's principal interrogator, who grilled her relentlessly, was Captain Pierre Bouchardon; he later prosecuted her at trial. Bouchardon established that much of the Mata Hari persona was invented. Far from being a Javanese princess, Zelle was a white Dutch national, a fact he used as evidence of her dubious and dishonest character at her trial. Zelle admitted to Bouchardon that she had accepted 20,000 francs from a German diplomat and former lover as reimbursement for belongings taken from her by the German Imperial authorities. Bouchardon claimed that this was, in fact, payment to her for spying for Germany. In the meantime, Captain Ladoux had been preparing a case against his former agent by casting all of her activities in the worst possible light, going so far as to engage in evidence tampering.

=== Scapegoat ===
Following the failures of the Nivelle Offensive and massive strikes, France was badly shaken by the Great Mutinies of the French Army in the spring of 1917. The country was close to collapsing from war exhaustion. Having one German spy to blame for everything that went wrong with the war was convenient for the French government, and Mata Hari seemed the perfect scapegoat. The case against her received maximum publicity in the French press and led to her importance being greatly exaggerated. The Canadian historian Wesley Wark stated in a 2014 interview that Mata Hari was never an important spy and the French military failures had nothing to do with her: "They needed a scapegoat, and she was a notable target for scapegoating." The British historian Julie Wheelwright stated: "She really did not pass on anything that you couldn't find in the local newspapers in Spain." Wheelwright described Zelle as "an independent woman, a divorcée, a citizen of a neutral country, a courtesan, and a dancer, which made her a perfect scapegoat for the French, who were then losing the war. She was held up as an example of what might happen if your morals were too loose."

Claiming her innocence, Zelle wrote letters to the Dutch ambassador in Paris. "My international connections are due [to] my work as a dancer, nothing else. Because I really did not spy, it is terrible that I cannot defend myself." A difficult moment for Mata Hari during the trial occurred when her lover Maslov—by now deeply embittered as a result of losing his eye in combat—declined to testify for her and told her that he did not care whether she was convicted. When Zelle learned that Maslov had abandoned her, she fainted.

Her defense counsel, veteran international lawyer Édouard Clunet, faced impossible odds; he was denied permission to cross-examine the prosecution's witnesses or to examine his witnesses directly. Bouchardon used the fact that Zelle was a woman as evidence of her guilt, saying: "Without scruples, accustomed to making use of men, she is the type of woman who is born to be a spy." Zelle has often been portrayed as a femme fatale, the dangerous, seductive woman who uses her sexuality to manipulate men effortlessly, but others view her differently: in the words of the American historians Norman Polmer and Thomas Allen she was "naïve and easily duped", a victim of men rather than a victimiser.

Although news reports that were following her execution claimed she had admitted to spying for Germany, Mata Hari actually made no such confession. She maintained throughout her ordeal that she had never been a German spy. At her trial, Zelle vehemently insisted that her sympathies were with the Allies and declared her passionate love of France, her adopted homeland. In October 2001, documents released from the archives of MI5 (British counter-intelligence) were used by a Dutch group, the Mata Hari Foundation, to ask the French government to exonerate Zelle, as they argued that the MI5 files proved she was not guilty of the charges she was convicted of. A spokesperson from the Mata Hari Foundation argued that, at most, Zelle was a low-level spy who provided no secrets to either side, stating: "We believe that there are sufficient doubts concerning the dossier of information that was used to convict her to warrant re-opening the case. Maybe she wasn't entirely innocent, but it seems clear she wasn't the master-spy whose information sent thousands of soldiers to their deaths, as has been claimed."

=== Execution ===
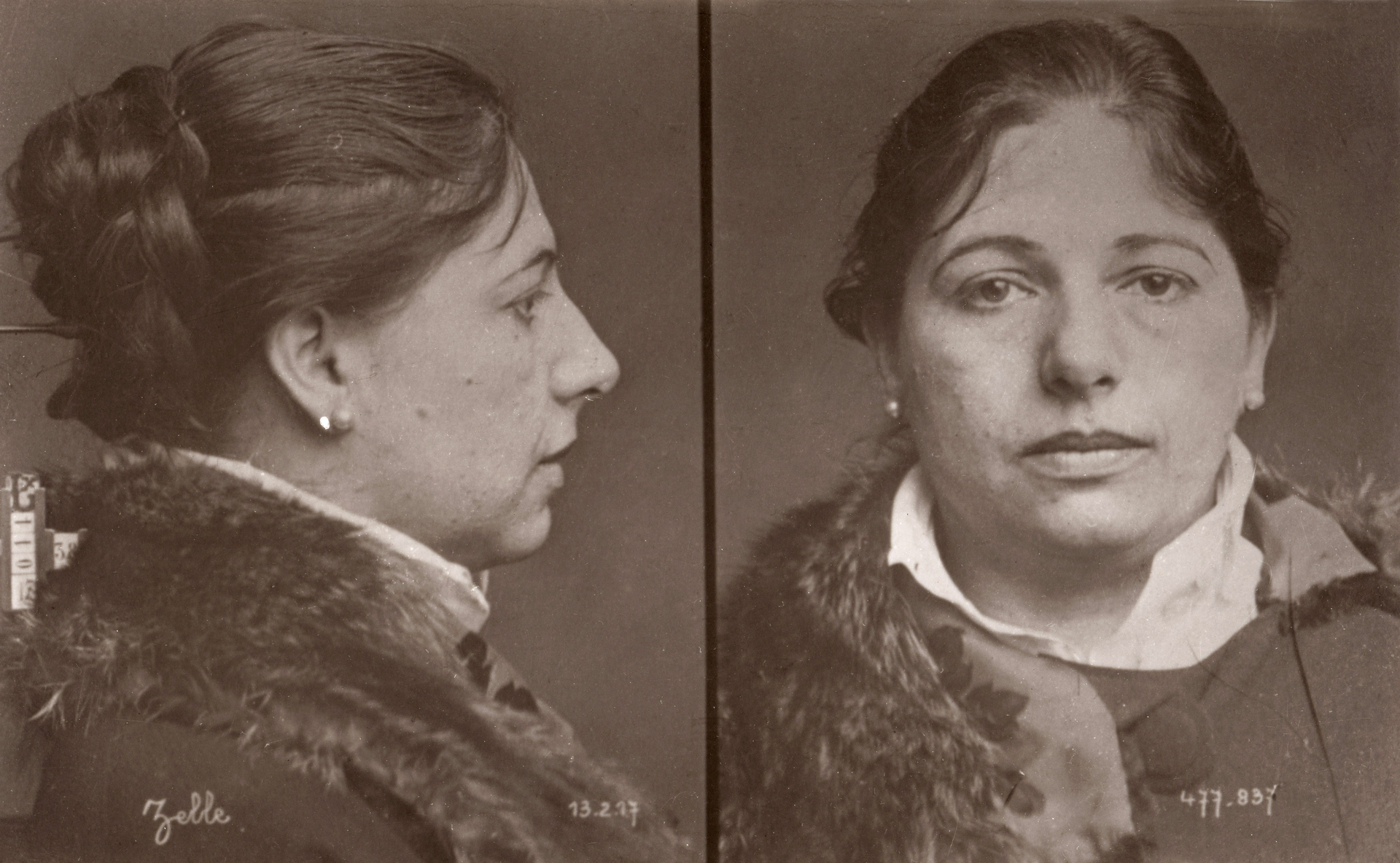
Mugshot of Margaretha Zelle

Zelle was executed in the moat of the Château de Vincennes, by a firing squad consisting of 12 French soldiers just before dawn on 15 October 1917. She was 41. According to an eyewitness account by British reporter Henry Wales, she was not bound and she refused a blindfold. She defiantly blew a kiss to the firing squad.

A 1934 New Yorker article reported that at her execution, she wore "a neat Amazonian tailored suit, especially made for the occasion, and a pair of new white gloves", though another account indicates she wore the same suit, low-cut blouse, and tricorn hat ensemble which had been picked out by her accusers for her to wear at trial, and which was still the only full, clean outfit which she had in prison. Neither description matches photographic evidence. Wales recorded her death, saying that after the volley of shots rang out, "Slowly, inertly, she settled to her knees, her head up always, and without the slightest change of expression on her face. For the fraction of a second it seemed she tottered there, on her knees, gazing directly at those who had taken her life. Then she fell backward, bending at the waist, with her legs doubled up beneath her." A non-commissioned officer then walked up to her body, pulled out his revolver, and shot her in the head to make sure she was dead.

=== Remains and 2017 French declassification ===
Mata Hari's body was not claimed by any family members and was accordingly used for medical study. Her head was embalmed and kept in the Museum of Anatomy in Paris. In 2000, archivists discovered that it had disappeared, possibly as early as 1954, according to curator Roger Saban, during the museum's relocation. Her head remains missing. Records dated 1918 show that the museum also received the rest of the body, but none of the remains could later be accounted for.

Mata Hari's sealed trial and other related documents, a total of 1,275 pages, were declassified by the French Army in 2017, one hundred years after her execution.

== Legacy ==
=== Museum exhibition ===
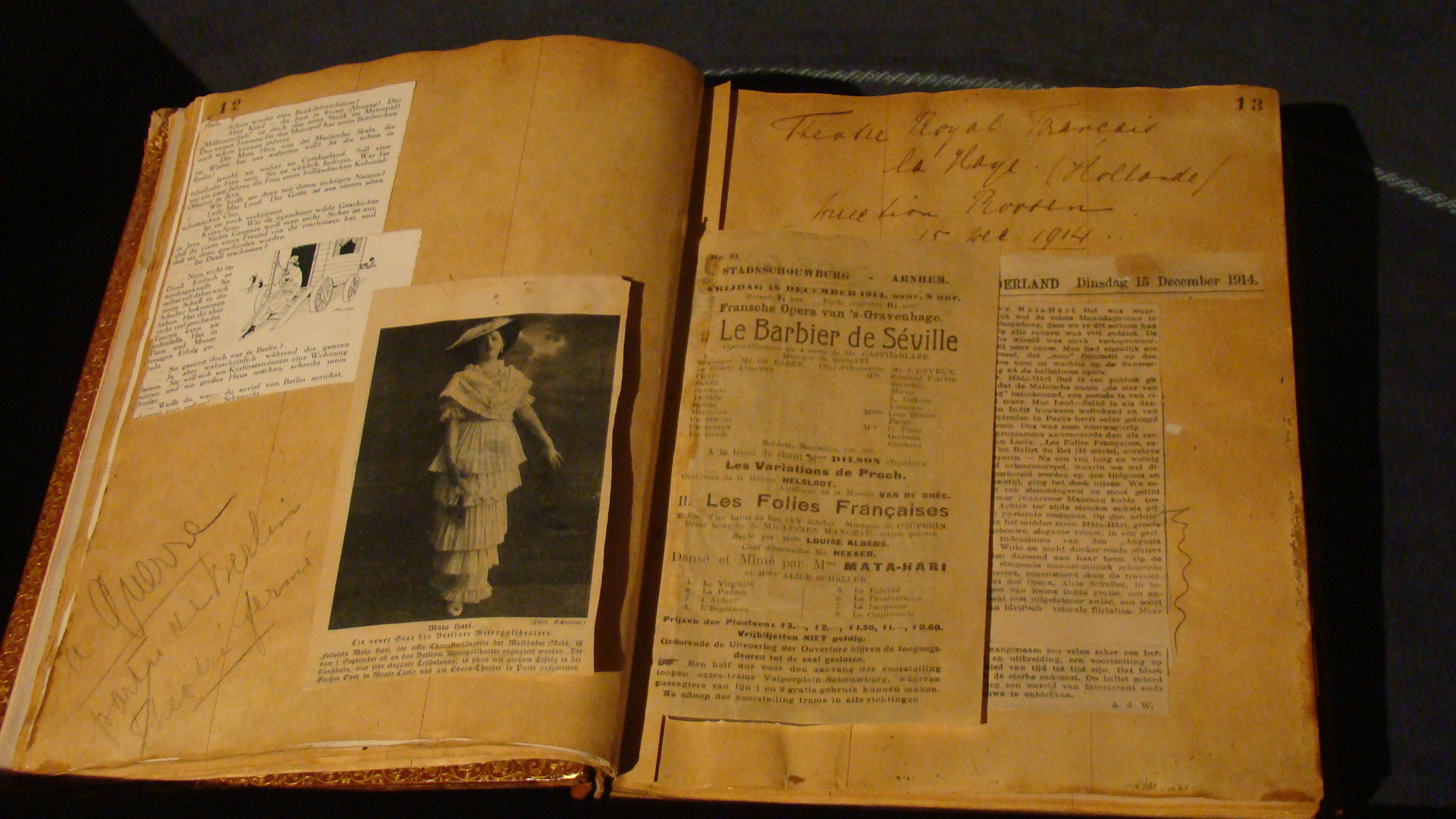
Scrapbook of Mata Hari in the Frisian Museum in Leeuwarden, Netherlands

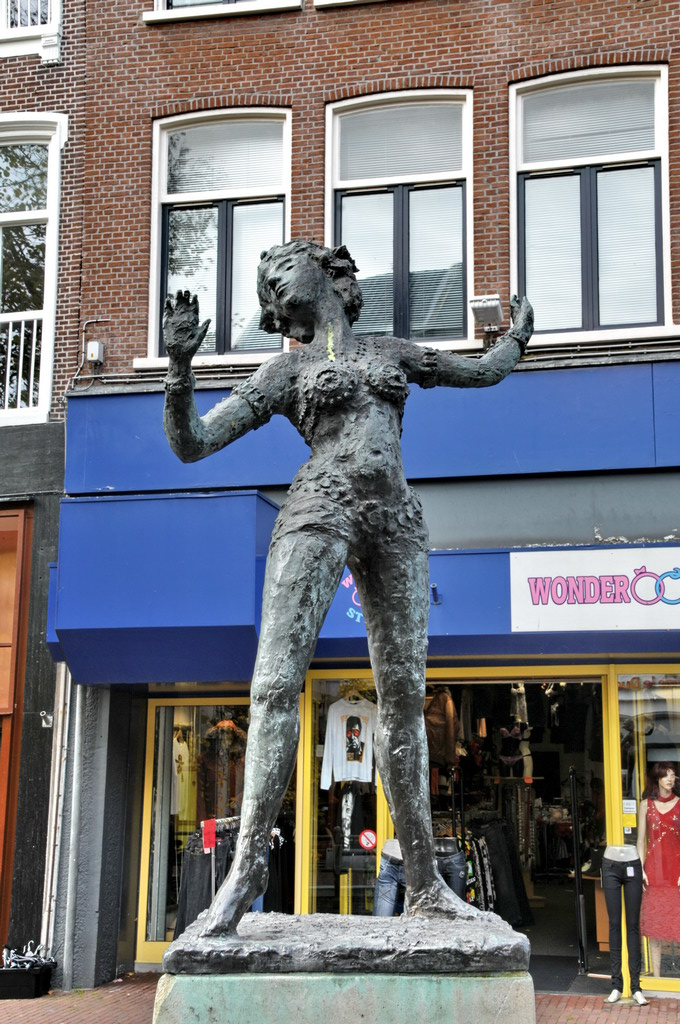
Statue of Mata Hari in Leeuwarden, Netherlands

The Frisian museum (Dutch: Fries Museum) in Leeuwarden, Netherlands, contains a "Mata Hari Room". Included in the exhibit are two of her personal scrapbooks and an oriental rug embroidered with the footsteps of her fan dance. Located in Mata Hari's native town, the museum is well known for researching the life and career of Leeuwarden's world-famous citizen. The largest-ever Mata Hari exhibition opened in the Museum of Friesland on 14 October 2017, one hundred years after her death.

Mata Hari's birthplace is located in the building at Kelders 33. The building suffered smoke and water damage during a fire in 2013 but was later restored. Architect Silvester Adema studied old drawings of the storefront to reconstruct it as it appeared when Adam Zelle, the father of Mata Hari, had a hat shop there. In 2016, an information centre (belevingscentrum) was created in the building displaying mementos of Mata Hari.

=== In popular culture ===
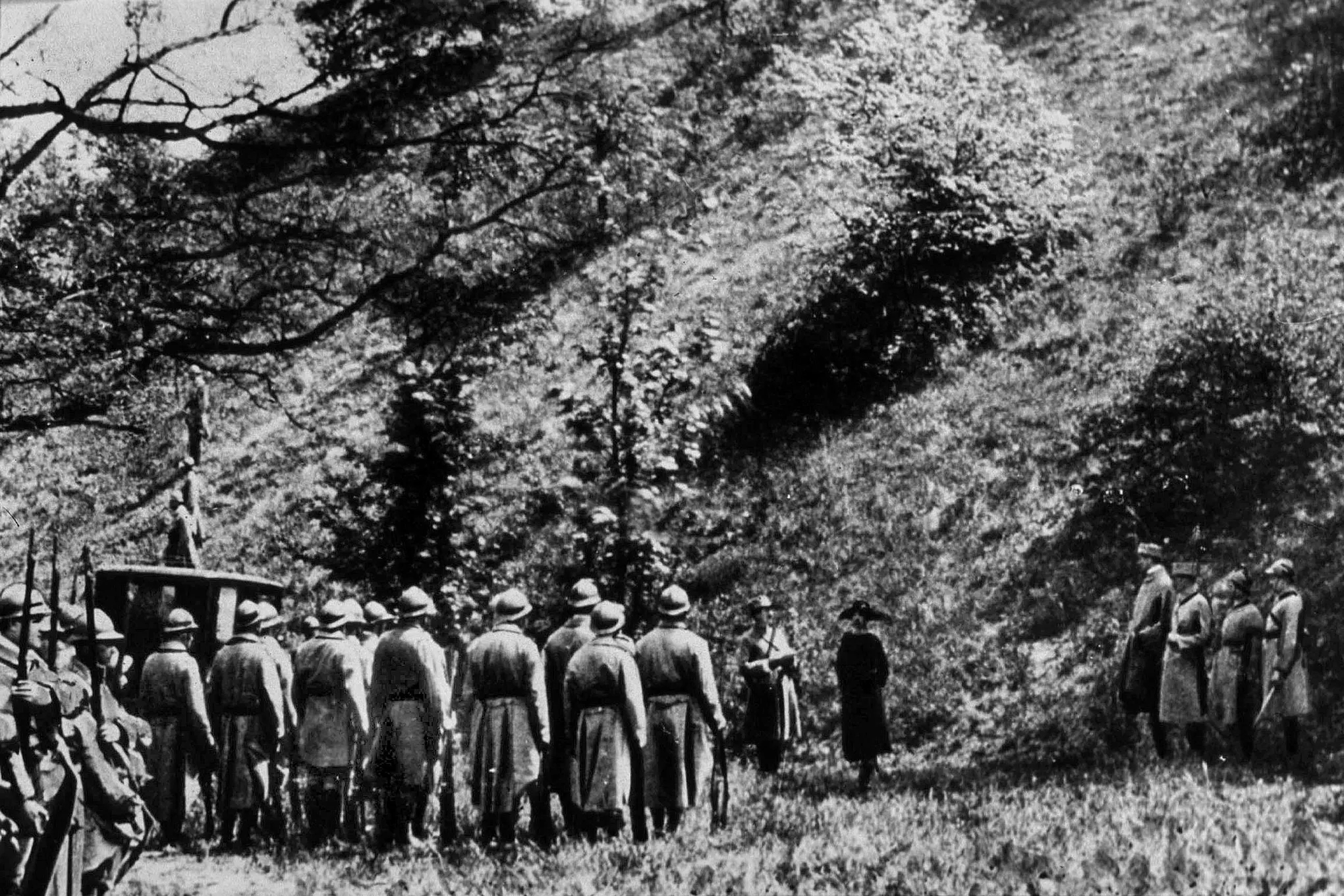
Execution scene from 1920 film about Mata Hari

==== Films ====
- Mata Hari (1920)
- Mata Hari (1927), a German production.
- Mata Hari (1931), a Hollywood motion picture starring Greta Garbo.
- In the 1939 romantic comedy Cafe Society, Mattie Harriett is hired by Allyn Joslyn's gossip columnist to spy on the film's two protagonists, Fred MacMurray and Madeleine Carroll.
- Mata Hari, Agent H21 (1964) with Jeanne Moreau as Mata Hari. Jean-Louis Trintignant, Claude Rich, Jean-Pierre Leaud, Marie Dubois, and Charles Denner co-star, directed by Jean-Louis Richard.
- In the 1967 James Bond spoof Casino Royale, Joanna Pettet played Mata Bond, said to be the daughter of James Bond and Mata Hari.
- In the 1966 film The Glass Bottom Boat, Doris Day's character is portrayed in a dream sequence as Mata Hari, a femme fatale come to steal national secrets from the male lead.
- In the 1968 Spanish comedy Operación Mata Hari, Mata Hari (Carmen de Lirio) retires with an accountant and her Spanish maid Guillermina (Gracita Morales) impersonates her in an espionage imbroglio.
- In the 1970 American series Lancelot Link, Secret Chimp, a chimpanzee named "Mata Hairi" plays the role of a secret agent, voiced by Joan Gerber.
- In the 1972 British comedy film Up the Front, Zsa Zsa Gabor portrays Mata Hari.
- Mata Hari (1981), television series.
- Mata Hari; The Magic Camera, an episode of Fantasy Island (1982).
- Mata Hari, a 1985 film starring Dutch actress Sylvia Kristel in the title role.
- In Paris, October 1916, a 1993 episode of George Lucas's The Young Indiana Jones Chronicles, she is portrayed by Domiziana Giordano. Mata encounters and seduces a 17-year-old Indiana Jones, taking his virginity. "Paris, October 1916" was later re-edited into the second half of the film Demons of Deception.
- Mata Hari (2016)
- Mata Hari (2017), short film.
- Mata Hari: The Naked Spy (2017)
- Mata Hari (2017), a 12-episode Russian-Portuguese TV series, stars Vahina Giocante in the title role.
- In the 2021 movie The King's Man, Mata Hari is portrayed by Austrian actress Valerie Pachner.
- 2025 "Behind The Myth", an episode of Josh Gates's Expedition Files (Discovery Channel) which investigates the spy accusations against Mata Hari (portrayed by French-Mexican actress Yadira Pascault Orozco) and whether the assertions were valid or not.

==== Stage musicals ====
- Mata Hari in 1967, starring Pernell Roberts and Marisa Mell.
- Mata Hari by Lene Lovich, Judge Smith, and Les Chappell, premiered in 1982 at the Lyric Theatre, Hammersmith.
- Mata!, with words and music by Stuart Brayson, premiered at Blackpool Grand Theatre in June 1995.
- Mata Hari at the Moulin Rouge by Frank Wildhorn debuted in Seoul, South Korea in March 2016.
- One Last Night with Mata Hari, written by Craig Walker with music by John Burge, debuted at the Isabel Bader Centre for the Performing Arts in Kingston, Ontario, in January 2017.
- In 2022 a musical adaptation by director Kim Moon Jeong and performed by the South Korean singer Solar from Mamamoo.

==== Songs ====
- Eurovision Song Contest
  - In 1976 Norway participated with the song "Mata Hari", performed by Anne-Karine Strøm.
  - In 2021 Azerbaijan participated with the song "Mata Hari", performed by Samira Efendi.
- In the 1982 release of Birds and Bees by the Belgian band Telex, the first track on the album is dedicated to Mata Hari.
- In 1995 Israeli singer Ofra Haza released a single titled "Mata Hari".
- In 2002 American singer-songwriter Warren Zevon referenced Mata Hari in his song "Genius" from the album My Ride's Here.
- Also in 2002 Italian singer Melody Castellari performed a Eurobeat song titled "Mata Hari (Spy Mix)" under her alias of "Energy-Girls", the latter was later released in a mixed album in 2004.
- In 2018 French nu-disco band L'Impératrice released their album titled Matahari, containing a song of the same name.
- In 2019 English singer-songwriter Frank Turner released a song about Mata Hari entitled "Eye of the Day" on his album No Man's Land.
- In 2020 the Dutch singer Kovacs released a single titled "Mata Hari".
- In 2026, the Serbian singer and media personality Jelena Karleuša released a single titled "Mata Hari".

==== Video games ====
- Mata Hari is a point-and-click video game released in 2008. The player controls Mata Hari herself in a fictional spy adventure during World War I.
- Mata Hari, as Margarete Gertrude Zelle, is one of the playable characters in the 2001 JRPG Playstation 2 game Shadow Hearts.
- The mobile JRPG Fate/Grand Order features Mata Hari as a playable Servant of the Assassin class.
- In the asymmetrical horror game Identity V, the survivor Margaretha Zelle (Female Dancer) is named after Mata Hari. The survivor Maratha Behamfil (Coordinator) also used the name "Margaretha Hari" as an alias.
- In the turn-based RPG video game Reverse: 1999, Mata Hari is depicted as the late sister of a character named "Anjo" Nala Hari, both of whom are succubi. While she does not make a physical appearance, Mata Hari plays a crucial role in Anjo Nala's early life.

==== Other ====
- In 1931 Mata Hari, an American thoroughbred racehorse, was foaled. She twice won championship honors as the top filly in the sport. In 1943 when in foal to fellow champion Balladier, she produced Spy Song.
- In 1977 Bally Manufacturing released an electromechanical pinball machine named after Mata Hari and a solid-state version in 1978.
- In February 2016 the Dutch National Ballet premiered a two-act ballet entitled Mata Hari, with Anna Tsygankova dancing the role of Mata Hari, choreography by Ted Brandsen, and music by Tarik O'Regan.
- In 2017 the opera Mata Hari by librettist Peter Peers and composer Matt Marks premiered at New York's Prototype Festival. In August 2018 it was also produced by West Edge Opera with Tina Mitchell reprising her starring role.
- In a 1940 The Three Stooges satire of Nazi Germany, You Nazty Spy!, Mata Hari is spoofed as "Mattie Herring", played by Lorna Gray. Another WWII-era parody, "Hatta Mari" (an anthropomorphic pigeon), appears in Plane Daffy, where she attempts to seduce Daffy Duck.

== See also ==
- List of dancers
- Women in dance
- Yoshiko Kawashima – Qing dynasty royal and Japanese spy (1907–1948) – sometimes known in fiction under the pseudonym "Eastern Mata Hari"
- Bertha Trost – British socialite and suspected spy
- Amy Elizabeth Thorpe – British intelligence agent (1910–1963)
- Kim Soo-im – South Korean interpreter (1911–1950), known as the Korean Mata Hari
