= Azerbaijan in the Eurovision Song Contest 2020 =

- Eurovision Song Contest 2020
- Country: Azerbaijan
- Selection process: Internal selection
- Announcement date: Artist: 28 February 2020; Song: 10 March 2020

Competing entry
- Song: "Cleopatra"
- Artist: Efendi
- Songwriters: Luuk van Beers; Alan Roy Scott; Sarah Lake

Placement
- Final result: Contest cancelled

Participation chronology

Azerbaijan was set to be represented at the Eurovision Song Contest 2020 with the song "Cleopatra" written by Luuk van Beers, Alan Roy Scott and Sarah Lake. The song was performed by Efendi, who was internally selected by the Azerbaijani broadcaster İctimai Television (İTV) to represent the nation at the 2020 contest in Rotterdam, Netherlands. Efendi's selection as the Azerbaijani Eurovision entrant was announced on 28 February 2020, while the song "Cleopatra" was presented to the public on 10 March.

Azerbaijan was drawn to compete in the first semi-final of the Eurovision Song Contest which took place on 12 May 2020. However, the contest was cancelled due to the COVID-19 pandemic.

== Background ==
Prior to the 2020 contest, Azerbaijan had participated in the Eurovision Song Contest twelve times since its first entry in 2008. Azerbaijan had won the contest on one occasion in 2011 with the song "Running Scared" performed by Ell and Nikki. Since their debut in 2008, Azerbaijan has had a string of successful results, qualifying to the final in every contest until in 2018 when they failed to qualify with the song "X My Heart" performed by Aisel. Azerbaijan has placed in the top ten seven times, including a third-place result in 2009 with the song "Always" performed by AySel and Arash and a second-place result in 2013 with the song "Hold Me" performed by Farid Mammadov. In 2019, Azerbaijan placed eighth with the song "Truth" performed by Chingiz.

The Azerbaijani national broadcaster, İctimai Television (İTV), broadcasts the event within Azerbaijan and organises the selection process for the nation's entry. İTV confirmed their intentions to participate at the 2020 Eurovision Song Contest on 16 September 2019. Azerbaijan had used various methods to select the Azerbaijani entry in the past, including internal selections of both the artist and song, as well as national finals to select their artist followed by an internal selection to determine the song. Between 2011 and 2013, Azerbaijan organized a national final titled Milli Seçim Turu to select the performer, song or both for Eurovision. In 2014, the broadcaster utilised an existing talent show format titled Böyük Səhnə where the winning performer would subsequently be given an internally selected song. Since 2015, the broadcaster internally selected both the artist and song that represented Azerbaijan, a procedure which continued for the selection of their 2020 entry.

== Before Eurovision ==
=== Internal selection ===
On 19 January 2020, İTV announced that both the artist and song that would represent Azerbaijan at the Eurovision Song Contest 2020 would be selected internally. Their announcement called for interested songwriters to submit their entries to the broadcaster by 7 February 2020. Songwriters could be of any nationality. On 28 February 2020, İTV announced that Samira Efendi would represent Azerbaijan. The selection of Efendi as the Azerbaijani Eurovision contestant was based on the decision of İTV and an international group of music and television industry experts from five potential performers: Elvin Novruzov, Jabrail Rasulov, Leman Dadashova, Riad Abdulov and Samira Efendi.

On 10 March 2020, İTV announced that Efendi would be performing the song "Cleopatra". The song was selected from over 700 submissions from local and international songwriters. "Cleopatra" was written by Luuk van Beers, Alan Roy Scott and Sarah Lake, and was presented on the same day via the release of the official music video. In regards to the song, Efendi stated: "'Cleopatra' is a song about trusting your gut instinct, standing up for yourself and being a 'queen' even when things get tough and especially if someone betrays or hurts you. It is truly a song about freedom, a celebration of all cultures and all sexualities and it’s a song that is meant to inspire people to be who they are and to be proud of themselves just as Cleopatra was. She was a queen who went through love, heartbreak, and betrayal, but she stood up for herself and is now remembered as an icon of strength and femininity."

== At Eurovision ==
According to Eurovision rules, all nations with the exceptions of the host country and the "Big Five" (France, Germany, Italy, Spain and the United Kingdom) are required to qualify from one of two semi-finals in order to compete for the final; the top ten countries from each semi-final progress to the final. The European Broadcasting Union (EBU) split up the competing countries into six different pots based on voting patterns from previous contests, with countries with favourable voting histories put into the same pot. On 28 January 2020, a special allocation draw was held which placed each country into one of the two semi-finals, as well as which half of the show they would perform in. Azerbaijan was placed into the first semi-final, to be held on 12 May 2020, and was scheduled to perform in the second half of the show. However, due to the COVID-19 pandemic, the contest was cancelled.

Prior to the Eurovision Song Celebration YouTube broadcast in place of the semi-finals, it was revealed that Azerbaijan was set to perform in position 12, following the entry from Croatia and before the entry from Cyprus.
