= Azerbaijan in the Eurovision Song Contest 2021 =

- Eurovision Song Contest 2021
- Country: Azerbaijan
- Selection process: Internal selection
- Announcement date: Artist: 20 March 2020; Song: 15 March 2021

Competing entry
- Song: "Mata Hari"
- Artist: Efendi
- Songwriters: Amy van der Wel; Josh Earl; Luuk van Beers; Tony Cornelissen

Placement
- Semi-final result: Qualified (8th, 138 points)
- Final result: 20th, 65 points

Participation chronology

Azerbaijan was represented at the Eurovision Song Contest 2021 with the song "Mata Hari" written by Amy van der Wel, Josh Earl, Luuk van Beers and Tony Cornelissen. The song was performed by Efendi, who was internally selected by the Azerbaijani broadcaster İctimai Television (İTV) to represent the nation at the 2021 contest in Rotterdam, Netherlands, after she was due to compete in the 2020 contest with "Cleopatra" before the 2020 event's cancellation. Efendi's selection as the Azerbaijani Eurovision entrant was announced on 20 March 2020, while the song "Mata Hari" was presented to the public on 15 March 2021.

Azerbaijan was drawn to compete in the first semi-final of the Eurovision Song Contest which took place on 18 May 2021. Performing during the show in position 14, "Mata Hari" was announced among the top 10 entries of the first semi-final and therefore qualified to compete in the final on 22 May. It was later revealed that Azerbaijan placed eighth out of the 16 participating countries in the semi-final with 138 points. In the final, Azerbaijan performed in position 21 and placed twentieth out of the 26 participating countries, scoring 65 points.

== Background ==
Prior to the 2021 contest, Azerbaijan had participated in the Eurovision Song Contest twelve times since its first entry in 2008. Azerbaijan had won the contest on one occasion in 2011 with the song "Running Scared" performed by Ell and Nikki. Since their debut in 2008, Azerbaijan has had a string of successful results, qualifying to the final in every contest until in 2018 when they failed to qualify with the song "X My Heart" performed by Aisel. Azerbaijan has placed in the top ten seven times, including a third-place result in 2009 with the song "Always" performed by AySel and Arash and a second-place result in 2013 with the song "Hold Me" performed by Farid Mammadov. In 2019, Azerbaijan placed eighth with the song "Truth" performed by Chingiz.

The Azerbaijani national broadcaster, İctimai Television (İTV), broadcasts the event within Azerbaijan and organises the selection process for the nation's entry. İTV confirmed their intentions to participate at the 2021 Eurovision Song Contest on 20 March 2020. Azerbaijan had used various methods to select the Azerbaijani entry in the past, including internal selections of both the artist and song, as well as national finals to select their artist followed by an internal selection to determine the song. Between 2011 and 2013, Azerbaijan organized a national final titled Milli Seçim Turu to select the performer, song or both for Eurovision. In 2014, the broadcaster utilised an existing talent show format titled Böyük Səhnə where the winning performer would subsequently be given an internally selected song. Since 2015, the broadcaster internally selected both the artist and song that represented Azerbaijan, a procedure which continued for the selection of their 2021 entry.

== Before Eurovision ==
=== Internal selection ===
Both the artist and song that represented Azerbaijan at the Eurovision Song Contest 2021 was selected internally by İTV. On 20 March 2020, the broadcaster confirmed that Efendi would remain as Azerbaijan's representative for the Eurovision Song Contest 2021. On 7 January 2021, interested songwriters were called upon to submit their entries by 1 February 2021. Songwriters could be of any nationality. Six potential songs were shortlisted from 229 submissions from local and international songwriters and revealed by INFE Azerbaijan on 9 February 2021: "Breathing You", "Manifesto", "Mata Hari", "Owe You Pretty", "Ratata" and "When I'm Gone".

On 13 March 2021, İTV announced that Efendi would be performing the song "Mata Hari". The selection of the song was based on the decision of İTV and an international group of more than 50 music industry experts and Eurovision fans. "Mata Hari" was written by Amy van der Wel, Josh Earl, Luuk van Beers and Tony Cornelissen, and was presented on 15 March 2021 via the release of the official music video. The song became Azerbaijan's first entry in the Eurovision Song Contest to feature lyrics in the Azerbaijani language.

It is very important to talk about strong women in order to remind our beautiful ladies that despite the fact that we still live in a world full of prejudices, a woman can do anything and female power cannot be compared with anything. And if suddenly you do not have enough inspiration now, let the stories of strong women in history become the source of that very charge of energy with which you can cope with everything and achieve even bigger success. There is a queen in each of us and I want to remind you that it's time to release her.

— Efendi about "Mata Hari"

== At Eurovision ==
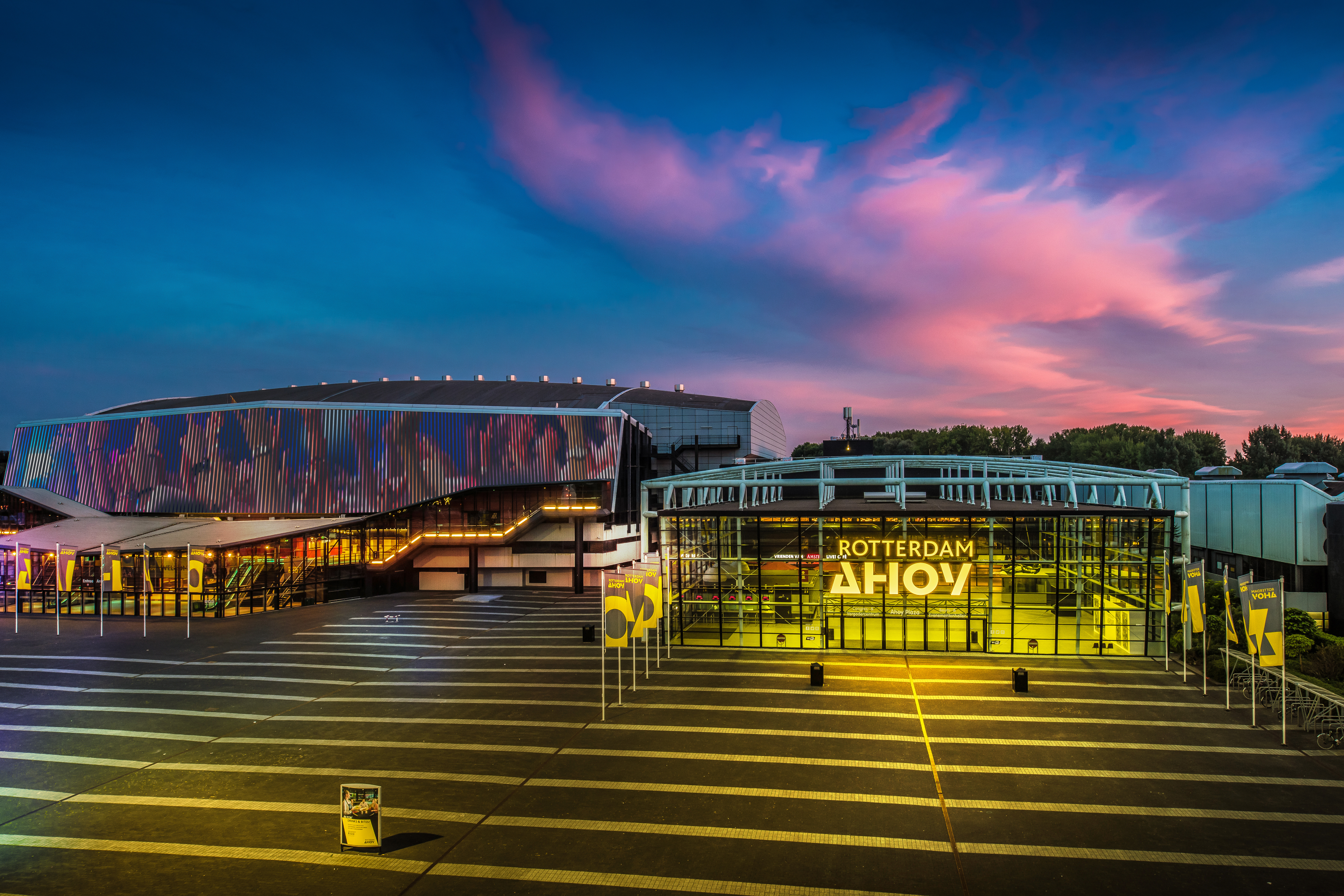
The Eurovision Song Contest 2021 took place at the Rotterdam Ahoy in Rotterdam, Netherlands

According to Eurovision rules, all nations with the exceptions of the host country and the "Big Five" (France, Germany, Italy, Spain and the United Kingdom) are required to qualify from one of two semi-finals in order to compete for the final; the top ten countries from each semi-final progress to the final. The European Broadcasting Union (EBU) split up the competing countries into six different pots based on voting patterns from previous contests, with countries with favourable voting histories put into the same pot. The semi-final allocation draw held for the Eurovision Song Contest 2020 on 28 January 2020 was used for the 2021 contest, which Azerbaijan was placed into the first semi-final, which was held on 18 May 2021, and was scheduled to perform in the second half of the show.

Once all the competing songs for the 2021 contest had been released, the running order for the semi-finals was decided by the shows' producers rather than through another draw, so that similar songs were not placed next to each other. Azerbaijan was set to perform in position 14, following the entry from Romania and before he entry from Ukraine.

The two semi-finals and final were broadcast in Azerbaijan on İTV with commentary by Murad Arif and Husniya Maharramova. The Azerbaijani spokesperson, who announced the top 12-point score awarded by the Azerbaijani jury during the final, was Azerbaijani Eurovision 2011 winner Ell and Nikki.

=== Semi-final ===
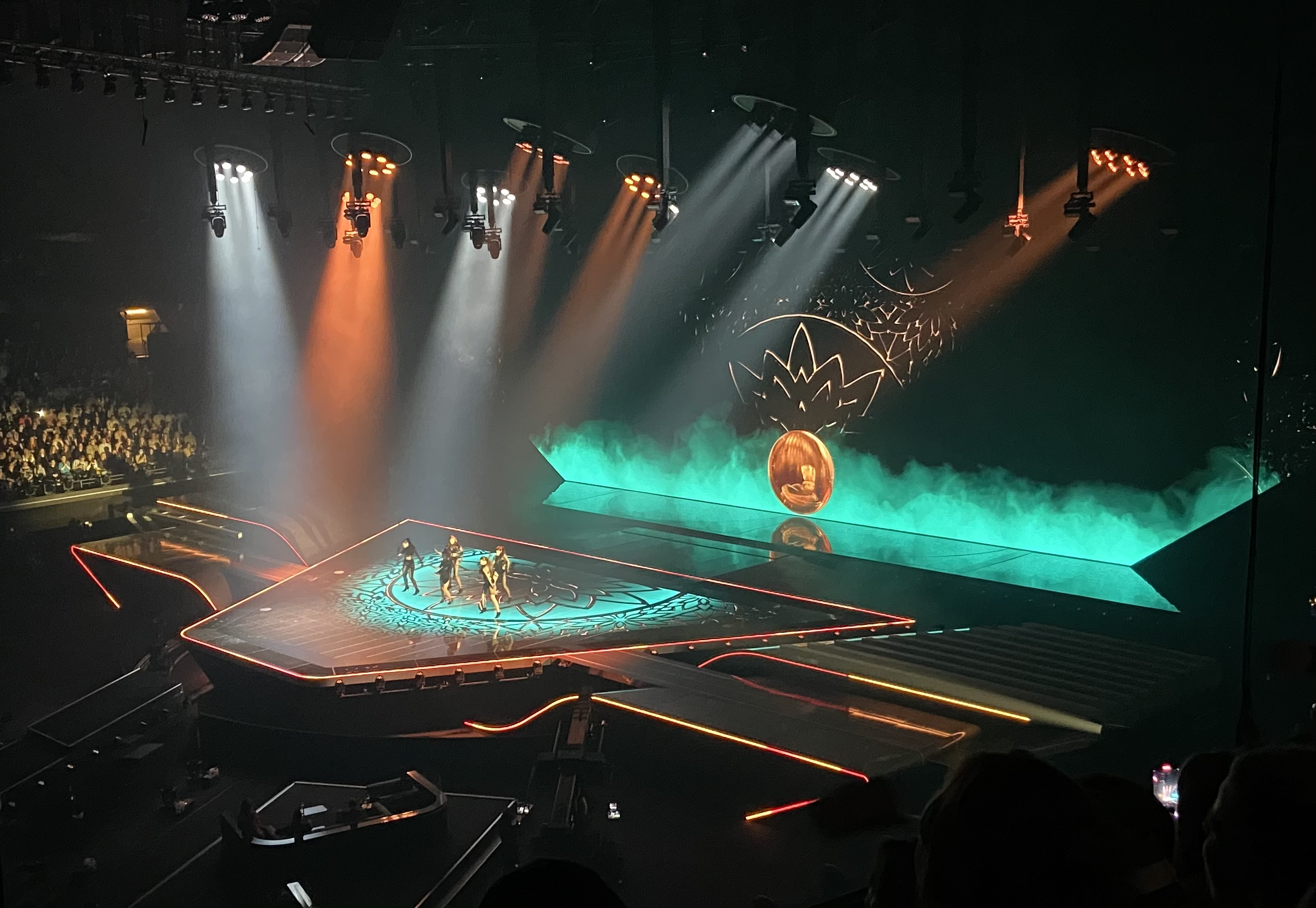
Efendi during a rehearsal before the first semi-final

Efendi took part in technical rehearsals on 9 and 12 May, followed by dress rehearsals on 17 and 18 May. This included the jury show on 17 May where the professional juries of each country watched and voted on the competing entries.

The Azerbaijani performance featured Efendi performing a choreographed routine with four dancers, all dressed in outfits designed by Rufat Ismayil. The LED screens transitioned from pink and blue ancient-style monuments with a gold orb to fire imagery as well as eastern-style symbols including a snake and an eye symbol, and the performance also incorporated pyrotechnic flame effects. The performance was directed by Mads Enggaard. The four dancers that joined Efendi on stage were Adelina Deli, Alina Lee, Sasha Golosnichenco and Veronika Volosova.

At the end of the show, Azerbaijan was announced as having finished in the top 10 and subsequently qualifying for the grand final. It was later revealed that Azerbaijan placed eighth in the semi-final, receiving a total of 138 points: 91 points from the televoting and 47 points from the juries.

=== Final ===
Shortly after the first semi-final, a winners' press conference was held for the ten qualifying countries. As part of this press conference, the qualifying artists took part in a draw to determine which half of the grand final they would subsequently participate in. This draw was done in the order the countries were announced during the semi-final. Azerbaijan was drawn to compete in the second half. Following this draw, the shows' producers decided upon the running order of the final, as they had done for the semi-finals. Azerbaijan was subsequently placed to perform in position 21, following the entry from France and before the entry from Norway.

Efendi once again took part in dress rehearsals on 21 and 22 May before the final, including the jury final where the professional juries cast their final votes before the live show. Efendi performed a repeat of her semi-final performance during the final on 22 May. Azerbaijan placed twentieth in the final, scoring 65 points: 33 points from the televoting and 32 points from the juries.

=== Voting ===
Voting during the three shows involved each country awarding two sets of points from 1-8, 10 and 12: one from their professional jury and the other from televoting. Each nation's jury consisted of five music industry professionals who are citizens of the country they represent, with a diversity in gender and age represented. The judges assess each entry based on the performances during the second Dress Rehearsal of each show, which takes place the night before each live show, against a set of criteria including: vocal capacity; the stage performance; the song's composition and originality; and the overall impression by the act. Jury members may only take part in panel once every three years, and are obliged to confirm that they are not connected to any of the participating acts in a way that would impact their ability to vote impartially. Jury members should also vote independently, with no discussion of their vote permitted with other jury members. The exact composition of the professional jury, and the results of each country's jury and televoting were released after the grand final; the individual results from each jury member were also released in an anonymised form.

Below is a breakdown of points awarded to Azerbaijan and awarded by Azerbaijan in the first semi-final and grand final of the contest, and the breakdown of the jury voting and televoting conducted during the two shows:

==== Points awarded to Azerbaijan ====
Points awarded to Azerbaijan (Semi-final 1)
Score	Televote	Jury
12 points		
10 points	Russia; Ukraine	
8 points	Croatia; Malta	Slovenia
7 points	Israel; North Macedonia; Romania	Ireland
6 points	Norway	Malta; North Macedonia; Norway
5 points	Belgium; Italy	Australia
4 points	Cyprus; Netherlands	Russia
3 points	Lithuania; Slovenia	Sweden
2 points	Germany	Netherlands
1 point	Australia; Sweden	

Points awarded to Azerbaijan (Final)
Score	Televote	Jury
12 points		
10 points		
8 points		Russia
7 points		
6 points		Moldova
5 points		Georgia
4 points	Bulgaria; Romania; Russia; Serbia	
3 points	Georgia; North Macedonia; Ukraine	Ukraine
2 points	Croatia; Greece; Israel	Albania; Ireland; Israel; Netherlands; Switzerland
1 point	Moldova; Norway	

==== Points awarded by Azerbaijan ====
Points awarded by Azerbaijan (Semi-final 1)
Score	Televote	Jury
12 points	Israel	Russia
10 points	Norway	Malta
8 points	Russia	Ukraine
7 points	Ukraine	Romania
6 points	Malta	Sweden
5 points	Romania	Croatia
4 points	Cyprus	Slovenia
3 points	Lithuania	Ireland
2 points	Croatia	Belgium
1 point	Sweden	Israel

Points awarded by Azerbaijan (Final)
Score	Televote	Jury
12 points	Israel	Russia
10 points	Italy	Greece
8 points	Ukraine	Moldova
7 points	Norway	Malta
6 points	Russia	Ukraine
5 points	Finland	Sweden
4 points	Switzerland	France
3 points	San Marino	Belgium
2 points	France	Portugal
1 point	Moldova	Bulgaria

==== Detailed voting results ====
The following members comprised the Azerbaijani jury:

- Sevda Alekbarzadeh
- Fuad Alishov
- Vagif Gerayzada
- Zamig Huseynov
- Atari Jafarova

Detailed voting results from Azerbaijan (Semi-final 1)
R/O	Country	Jury							Televote	
R/O	Country	Juror A	Juror B	Juror C	Juror D	Juror E	Rank	Points	Rank	Points
01	Lithuania	11	9	10	14	9	15		8	3
02	Slovenia	7	6	6	10	8	7	4	13	
03	Russia	1	1	3	3	3	1	12	3	8
04	Sweden	3	14	1	12	5	5	6	10	1
05	Australia	15	15	13	4	10	13		12	
06	North Macedonia	14	12	15	5	12	14		15	
07	Ireland	12	2	14	6	15	8	3	14	
08	Cyprus	8	11	7	11	7	11		7	4
09	Norway	13	8	9	13	6	12		2	10
10	Croatia	4	7	5	8	14	6	5	9	2
11	Belgium	10	5	4	15	13	9	2	11	
12	Israel	9	13	12	7	4	10	1	1	12
13	Romania	6	10	2	2	11	4	7	6	5
14	Azerbaijan									
15	Ukraine	2	4	8	9	2	3	8	4	7
16	Malta	5	3	11	1	1	2	10	5	6

Detailed voting results from Azerbaijan (Final)
R/O	Country	Jury							Televote	
R/O	Country	Juror A	Juror B	Juror C	Juror D	Juror E	Rank	Points	Rank	Points
01	Cyprus	10	16	23	21	19	19		15	
02	Albania	20	10	19	25	18	20		21	
03	Israel	11	17	15	12	14	16		1	12
04	Belgium	16	15	7	19	2	8	3	17	
05	Russia	1	1	3	3	3	1	12	5	6
06	Malta	5	7	12	2	1	4	7	12	
07	Portugal	12	3	14	8	12	9	2	25	
08	Serbia	24	18	10	11	24	18		18	
09	United Kingdom	23	22	24	22	25	24		22	
10	Greece	6	6	2	1	8	2	10	11	
11	Switzerland	15	2	17	17	15	12		7	4
12	Iceland	19	8	18	16	17	17		16	
13	Spain	17	21	25	20	13	21		24	
14	Moldova	2	4	4	5	7	3	8	10	1
15	Germany	22	24	21	24	21	23		19	
16	Finland	13	14	5	9	11	13		6	5
17	Bulgaria	7	12	13	6	10	10	1	20	
18	Lithuania	21	23	20	13	22	22		14	
19	Ukraine	3	5	9	10	5	5	6	3	8
20	France	9	13	16	4	4	7	4	9	2
21	Azerbaijan									
22	Norway	18	9	8	18	16	15		4	7
23	Netherlands	25	25	22	23	23	25		23	
24	Italy	14	19	6	14	6	14		2	10
25	Sweden	4	20	1	15	20	6	5	13	
26	San Marino	8	11	11	7	9	11		8	3
