= Rufat =

Rufat or Rufet is a masculine given name and surname of Azerbaijani origin. Notable people with the name include:

== Given name ==
=== Rufat ===
- Rufat Abdullazade (born 2001), Azerbaijani footballer
- Rufat Ahmadov (born 2002), Azerbaijani footballer
- Rufat Amirov, Azerbaijani general
- Rufat Aslanli (born 1970), Azerbaijani official
- Rufat Bagirov (born 1979), Azerbaijani chess grandmaster
- Rufat Dadashov (born 1991), Azerbaijani footballer
- Rufat Hasanov (born 1987), Azerbaijani film director, producer, and editor
- Rufat Huseynov (born 1997), Azerbaijani boxer
- Rufat Ismayil (born 1981), Azerbaijani fashion designer
- Rufat Ismayilov (born 1996), Azerbaijani judoka
- Rufat Mahomedov (born 1992), Ukrainian judoka
- Rufat Quliyev (footballer) (born 1972), Azerbaijani footballer
- Rufat Riskiyev (1949–2026), Soviet-Uzbek boxer
- Rufat Safarov (born 1981), Azerbaijani human rights defender, political prisoner, and investigator

=== Rufet ===
- Rufet Guliyev (born 1963), Azerbaijani politician

== Surname ==
- Ramón Rufat (1916–1993), Spanish anarcho-syndicalist
