= Rufat Ismayil =

Azerbaijani designer and businessman

- Born: Rufat Ali oglu Ismayilov; 2 February 1981 (age 44); Baku, Azerbaijan SSR, Soviet Union
- Occupation: Fashion designer

Rufat Ali oglu Ismayilov, more commonly known under the pseudonym of Rufat Ismayil (Azerbaijani: Rüfət İsmayıl; 2 February 1981), is an Azerbaijani fashion designer, model, entrepreneur and businessman. Rufat Ismayil founded the AFFFAIR textile firm and the AFFFAIR brand, as well as the official fashion ambassador of Turkey and Azerbaijan on the world arena. He is the first Azerbaijani designer to have his collections shown at fashion weeks in Dubai, Istanbul, Tehran, Paris, Milan, Beirut, New York City, Florence, and Bucharest.

== Early years ==
Rufat Ali oglu Ismayilov was born on February 2, 1981, in Baku, the capital of Soviet Azerbaijan, in the family of Ali Ismailov and Dilbar Topchubashova. Rufat Ismayil enrolled at the 20th Secondary School of Baku's Narimanov District in 1986 and graduated from its 10th grade in 1996, while also studying music at the Narimanov District's 16th Music School from 1987 to 1995. He also enrolled in the Osman Mirzayev Journalism Program, from which he graduated with honours in 1994. He graduated from the Azerbaijan High Diplomatic College's Faculty of International Relations in 2001 and studied at Goethe University's Faculty of International Relations in Germany from 2002 to 2007. Rufat Ismayil also studied design and modeling at Esmod Vakko Design School in Turkey between 2013 and 2014. He speaks Azerbaijani, Turkish, Russian, German, Flemish and English.

== Career ==
=== Fashion ===
At the age of 19, Rufat Ismayil moved to Amsterdam, the Netherlands, and began working with Valentin Yudashkin, Paco Rabanne, and many other designers. As a youngster, he began working as a model in fashion firms and was named Azerbaijan's "Best Model" in 2000. In 2014, Rufat Ismayil launched the Affair.fff men's collection in Milan. He founded the AFFFAIR textile firm as well as the AFFFAIR brand. Rufat Ismayil lives in Istanbul, Turkey, and has been named Turkey's "Best Fashion Designer". The collection of Rufat Ismayil was also on display at Pitti Uomo. In 2018, Fashion TV awarded him the title of Europe's best designer. His fashion collections were featured in various fashion magazines, including Vogue Italia. He was the first Azerbaijani to be the face of Men's Health in 2019. The designer's Butterfly Effect collection was shown in New York in February of the same year, while his Affair Khari Bulbul floral collection was shown during New York Fashion Week.

Rufat Ismayil exhibited his new collection alongside Turkish actress Nebahat Çehre in September 2020. In the same year, he appeared in the Turkish TV series Menajerimi Ara, which aired on Star TV. AFFFAIR autumn–winter 2020–2021 collection debuted at Paris Fashion Week. Due to the COVID-19 threat, Rufat Ismayil's collection was presented digitally at Fashion Forward Dubai. Another presentation of his collection was held in London from the 10th to the 15th of April. In Paris in October 2021, he debuted his Haute Couture Sumakh collection, which was inspired by Azerbaijani rug, culture, and the victory in the Second Nagorno-Karabakh War. The Sumakh collection, created with the help of the Heydar Aliyev Foundation and the State Committee on Work with Diaspora, features 21 pieces of apparel inspired by Azerbaijani rug themes such as Chalabi, Khanlig, Nalbeki-gyul, and others.

Beyoncé, J. Lo, Ariana Grande, Lil' Kim, Paris Hilton, Dua Lipa, Jordana Houston, Ashanti, Lauren Jauregui, Christina Aguilera and others are among Rufat Ismayil's celebrity clients. In Azerbaijan, he primarily works with Aygun Kazimova. Rufat Ismayil also designed clothing for Azerbaijan's First Vice President, Mehriban Aliyeva. Ashanti and Inas X wore outfits created by Rufat Ismayil to the 61st Annual Grammy Awards. He created the outfit for Azerbaijani contestant of 61st Annual Grammy Awards, Samira Efendi. He also designed her custom for her performance on the Eurovision Song Contest 2021, using modern and traditional elements.
