= Bertha Trost =

British socialite and suspected spy

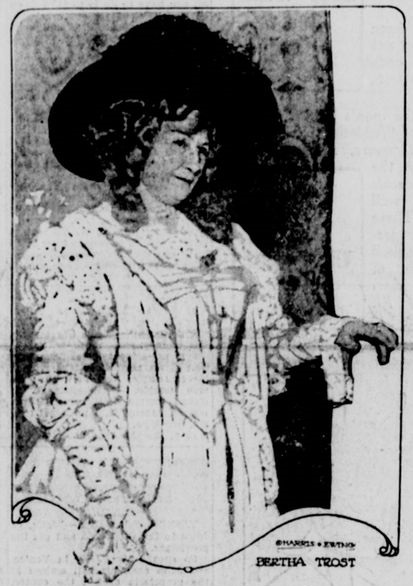
- Madame Bertha Trost
- Born: Bertha Trost; Potsdam, Germany
- Occupations: Socalite, beauty specialist
- Children: At least one

Bertha Trost was a socialite and beauty specialist of German birth, resident in Britain, who was forced out of the United Kingdom for being a suspected German spy.

== Early life ==
Around 1885 she was married in Germany and had at least one son. In 1895, Bertha Trost moved from Potsdam to London. The Seattle Star claimed that she was forced to move to London after a scandal in the Imperial Austro-Hungarian court in Vienna.

== London life ==
She lived 30 years in London setting up two shops, a beauty salon and an antiquarian shop. She was famous for dressing up in Victorian garb and was regularly seen in Hyde Park. At her beauty shop she would allow clients to run up huge debts and then get the clients to provide information to pay off these debts.

== Exile ==
In 1915 she used her network to find information about her German son who, she had heard, had been captured by the British during World War I. Scotland Yard became aware of her and after digging into her past found her German roots. Although she had lived in London for thirty years she had never naturalized and Scotland Yard used her status as a foreigner to force her out of the country. In a last-ditch effort she married an English gentleman but it did not halt her deportation; her shops and belongings were seized by the British Public Trustee.

== See also ==
- Mata Hari

== Bibliography ==
Notes

References

- "Deporting of Jandtha". Clutha Leader. Otago, New Zealand: William Peter McGirr, 1874-. 20 August 1915. p. 8. ISSN 2463-6932.
- Gosling, Lucinda (2014). Great War Britain: The First World War at Home. The History Press. ISBN 9780750957311. - Total pages: 240
- "Most Dangerous Woman In London Deported By Government". The Seattle Star. Seattle: E. H. Wells & Co. 9 July 1915. p. 12. ISSN 2159-5577. OCLC 17285351.
