= SS Prinses Amalia =

Dutch steam ship, launched 1874

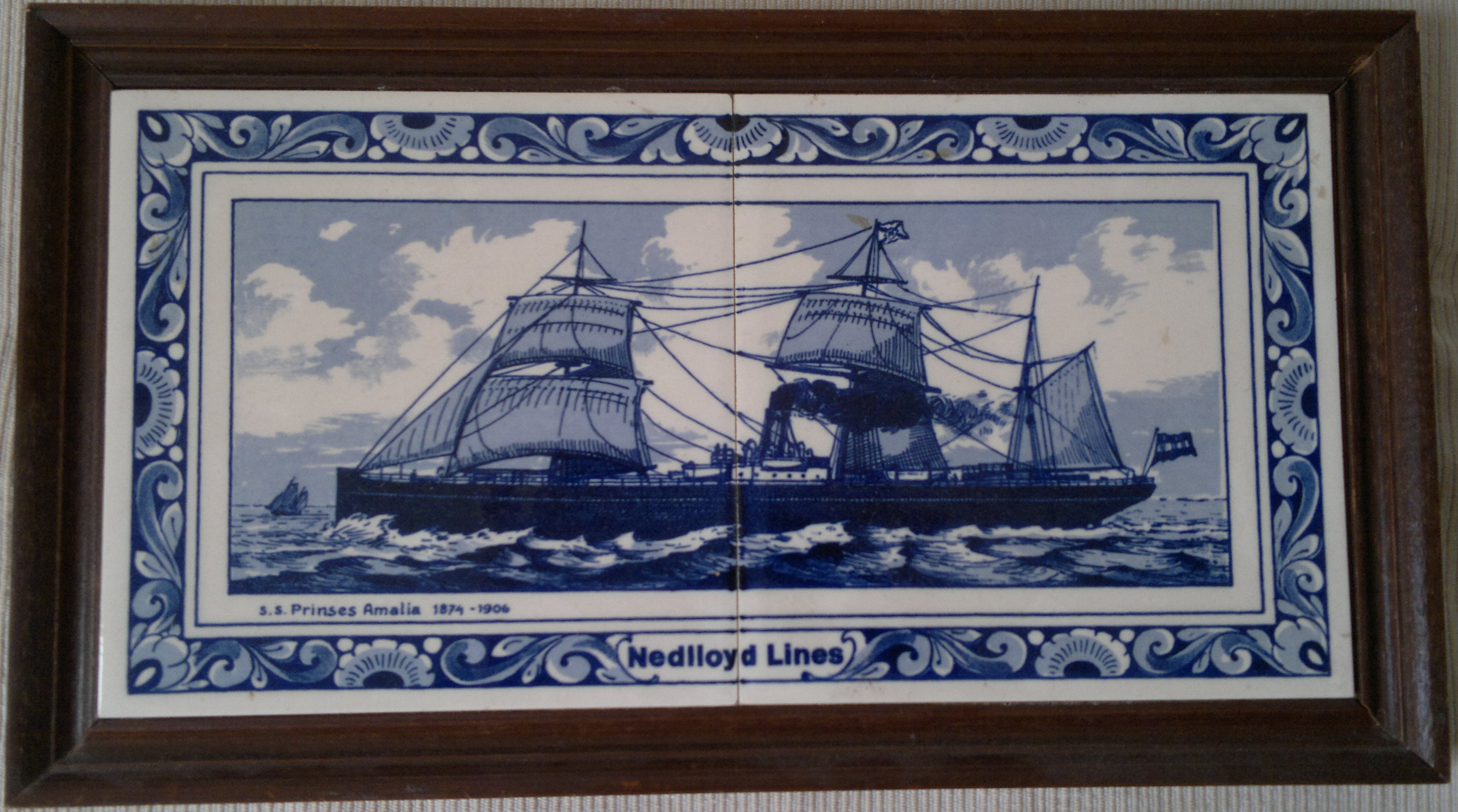
- A pair of commemorative Delftblue tiles issued by Nedlloyd showing SS Prinses Amalia

History

Netherlands
- Name: SS Prinses Amalia
- Owner: Dutch Stoomvaart Maatschappij Nederland 1874-1904; L. Pittaluga 1906
- Ordered: 21 June 1873
- Builder: John Elder & Co.
- Cost: 984,840 guilders
- Yard number: 166
- Laid down: 14 August 1873
- Launched: 19 March 1874
- Out of service: 1906
- Renamed: Amalia, 1906
- Fate: Broken up, 1906

General characteristics
- Type: Passenger liner
- Tonnage: 3,480 GRT
- Length: 371 ft 6 in (113.2 m)
- Beam: 39 ft 9 in (12.1 m)
- Draught: 22.2 feet (6.8 m)
- Installed power: 1,600 ihp (1,200 kW) (as built)
- Propulsion: As built:: Single screw, 2-cylinder; 50 & 86 in × 42 in; (1,300 & 2,200 mm × 1,100 mm) steam engine; From 1892: Single screw, triple-expansion 3-cylinder steam engine by Kon. Maats De Schelde, Vlissingen
- Sail plan: 3-masted barque
- Speed: 11.5 knots (21.3 km/h; 13.2 mph)

SS Prinses Amalia was a Dutch steamship of the Netherland Line (Dutch Stoomvaart Maatschappij Nederland (SMN) or Netherlands Steamship Company).

== Ordering and Construction ==
SS Prinses Amalia was built for Stoomvaart Maatschappij Nederland (SMN) by John Elder & Co. of Govan on the River Clyde. She was launched on 19 March 1874. On her first trip she would be the largest ship steaming from the Netherlands. She was expected there in early May. In early April it became known that delivery would be delayed and Prinses Amalia would leave the Netherlands in June. On 6 June 1874 Prinses Amalia made her trial runs on the Clyde, reaching about 12 knots. That same evening she left Greenock for Nieuwediep (Den Helder) On 10 June 1874 SS Prinses Amalia arrived in Nieuwediep.

== Characteristics ==
=== Dimensions ===
SS Prinses Amalia was 383 feet long, 40 feet wide and had a draught of 31 feet 6 inches. The cargo size of the ship was 3,500 tons.

=== Machinery ===
The compound steam engines were also delivered by the shipyard. The nominal power of the engines was 400 hp. There were two direct acting cylinders, one of 86 inch diameter, the other of 50 inch diameter, each with a stroke of 3 feet 6 inches.

There were also steam engines to drive the anchor winch and other winches.

=== Accommodation ===
SS Prinses Amalia had place for 76 first class passengers, 32 second class passengers, and some third class passengers. Near the bow of the ship was a section for soldiers. It was the least comfortable part of the ship, with soldiers sleeping in hammocks. Behind the soldiers section were the cabins for the 32 second class passengers. These were grouped around a saloon, which was also used to dine. A pantry was available to serve dinner in this saloon. It was also used to serve drinks. Any non-commanding officers would be transported in the second class. The first class was in the rear of the ship. Any military officers would be housed in the first class. The first class saloon was partly gilded and had painted panels. This room had three big tables to seat the 74 first class passengers.

Every first class cabin had two washstands, so that of the three or four gentlemen that shared a cabin at least two could freshen themselves at the same time. There were also cabins for families with internal doors to children's cabins.

== Service ==
Prinses Amalia was one of the earliest steamers to operate in the Amsterdam - Java service (inaugurated by SMN in 1871), spending her entire service life on this route.

On her maiden voyage to the Dutch East Indies SS Prinses Amalia carried many parts of Batavia Dock. This iron floating dry dock was transported to the Dutch East Indies in parts, and would be assembled on Untung Jawa (Amsterdam Island). On 16 June 1874 Prinses Amalia sailed from Nieuwediep for Southampton, Naples and ultimately Batavia. In the evening of the 17th she arrived in Southampton. On 19 June she left Southampton again. On 29 June she arrived in Naples, whence she left on the morrow. On 2 July she was at Port Said. On 6 July she left Suez. On 24 July 1874 Prinses Amalia arrived in Padang. On 31 July she arrived in Batavia. It was a swift voyage, and without all the stops, it would have been the fastest trip from Nieuwediep to Batavia up to that date.

== Fate ==
She was broken up at Genoa in 1906 having been renamed Amalia for her final delivery voyage.

== Notable passengers ==
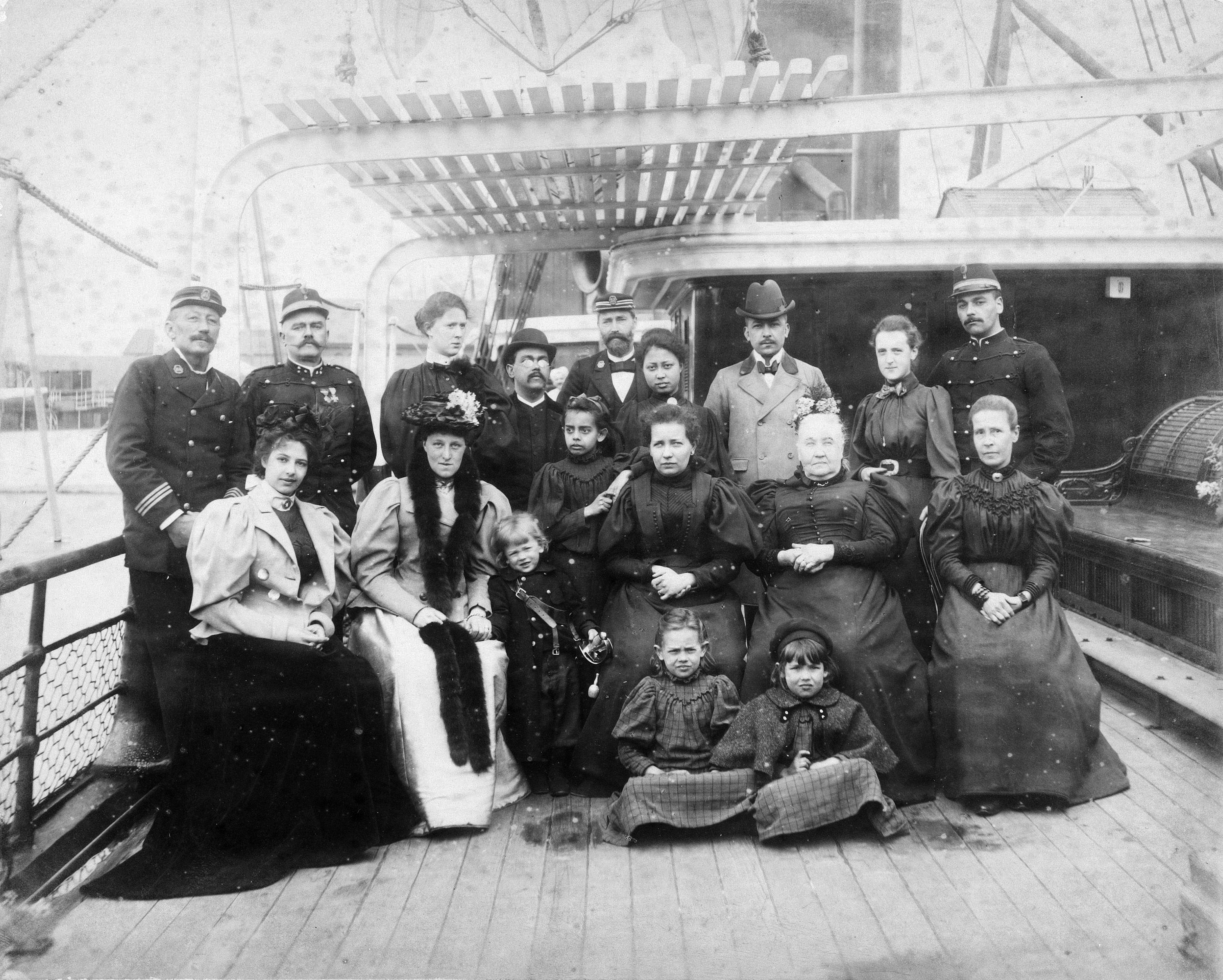
Margaretha Geertruida MacLeod-Zelle and Rudolph John MacLeod on board in 1897

- Mata Hari, departed Amsterdam 1 May 1897 bound for the Dutch East Indies.
- Eugène Dubois, departed Amsterdam 29 October 1887 bound for the Dutch East Indies.
