= Chingiz Mustafayev (singer) =

Azerbaijani singer-songwriter (born 1991)

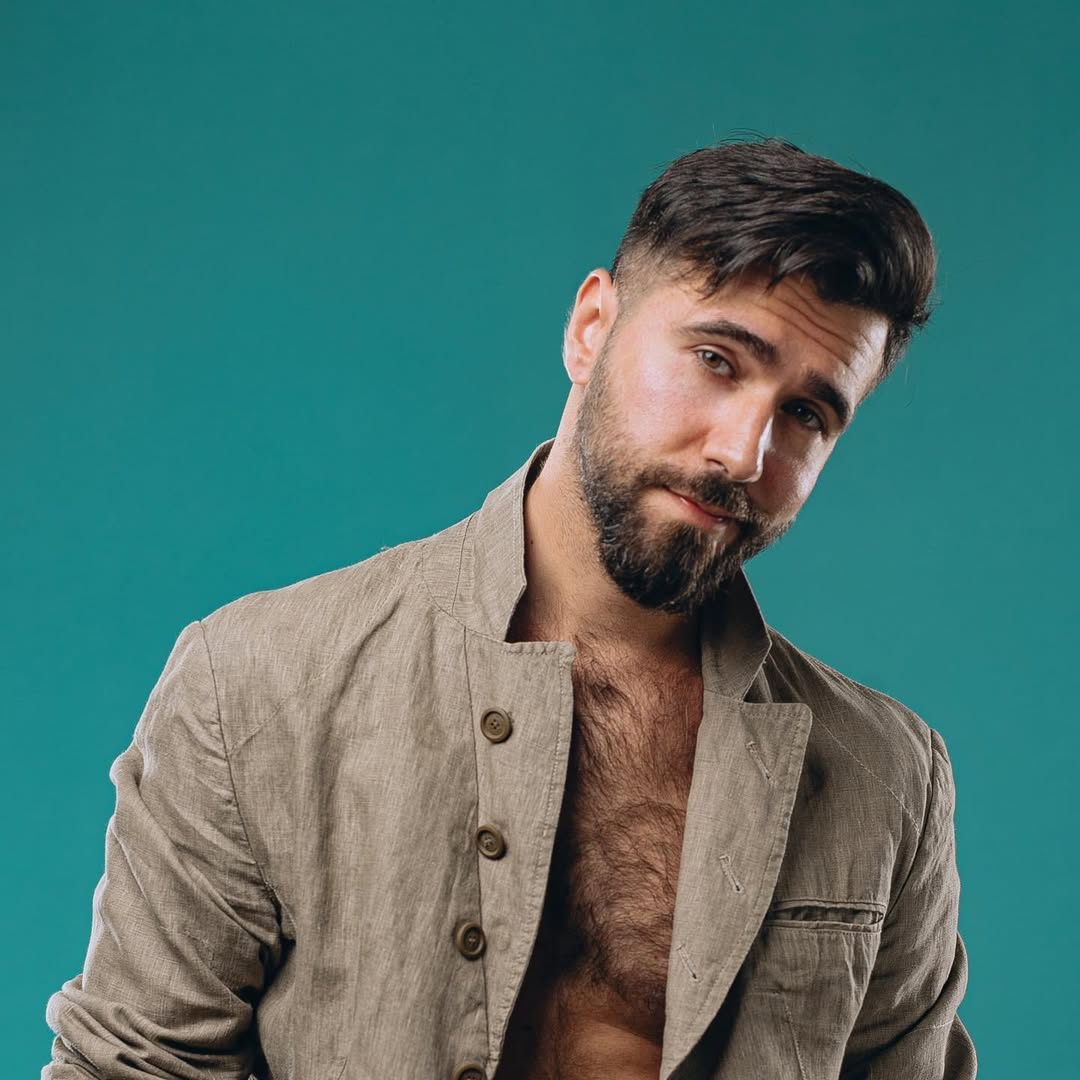
- Mustafayev in 2022

Background information
- Born: Çingiz Mustafayev; 11 March 1991 (age 35); Moscow, Russian SFSR, USSR
- Origin: Baku, Azerbaijan
- Genres: Pop, folk
- Occupation: Singer
- Years active: 2007–present

Chingiz Maharram oglu Mustafayev (Azerbaijani: Çingiz Məhərrəm oğlu Mustafayev; born 11 March 1991) is an Azerbaijani singer, songwriter, and guitarist. He represented Azerbaijan in the Eurovision Song Contest 2019 with the song "Truth", finishing in eighth place.

== Early life ==
Mustafayev was born in Moscow and moved to his parents' native Qazax, Azerbaijan when he was six years old. He learned to play the guitar and started composing his own songs while still a young boy.

== Career ==
At age 13, he moved with his mother and his brother to Baku where he auditioned for the Azerbaijani version of Pop Idol in 2007. Mustafayev won the competition, and soon became a rising star in the Azerbaijani music industry. In 2013, he represented Azerbaijan internationally in the New Wave competition in Jūrmala, Latvia. He placed 11th overall and sang along with Polina Gagarina. Three years later, Mustafayev auditioned for the sixth season of The Voice of Ukraine, however he was eliminated in the subsequent Battle Round. Since then, Chingiz has performed with his group Palmas, which meld traditional Azerbaijani and Turkish folk sounds with flamenco guitar, rock, and pop twists. In early 2019, Chingiz released the single "Tənha gəzən".

On 8 March 2019, it was confirmed that Chingiz would represent Azerbaijan in the Eurovision Song Contest 2019 with the song "Truth". He performed in the second semi-final on 16 May 2019 in Tel Aviv, Israel as 18th, closing the semi-final. He placed 5th with 224 points, thus qualifying for the grand final on 18 May 2019. In the final, he placed 8th in a field of 26 participants with 302 points. In May 2019, Chingiz took part at a photoshoot for the eighth edition of Ukrainian magazine NVRMIND.

== Discography ==
=== Singles ===
Title	Year	Peak chart positions				Album
Title	Year	SCO	SWE	SWI	UK Down.	Album
"Qürbət"	2018	—	—	—	—	Non-album singles
"Get"	2018	—	—	—	—	Non-album singles
"Tənha gəzən"	2019	—	—	—	—	Non-album singles
"Truth"	2019	49	91	43	35	Non-album singles
"Bir sözlə"	2019	—	—	—	—	Non-album singles
"Güven bana"	2020	—	—	—	—	Non-album singles
"From Past to Present"	2020	—	—	—	—	Non-album singles
"Xilaskar" (with Farid Aqa)	2020	—	—	—	—	Non-album singles
"Dayan zaman"	2020	—	—	—	—	Non-album singles
"Can-Can"	2020	—	—	—	—	Non-album singles
"Qarabağ"	2020	—	—	—	—	Non-album singles
"Gülzar istərəm"	2021	—	—	—	—	Non-album singles
"Dəyməz"	2021	—	—	—	—	Non-album singles
"Yenə mənəm"	2021	—	—	—	—	Non-album singles
"Ay qız"	2022	—	—	—	—	Non-album singles
"Vay vay"	2022	—	—	—	—	Non-album singles
"Beni benden alan"	2023	—	—	—	—	Non-album singles
"Gözümün bəbəyi"	2023	—	—	—	—	Non-album singles
"Söz"	2023	—	—	—	—	Non-album singles
"Vicdan"	2024	—	—	—	—	Non-album singles
"Her şey içinde"	2024	—	—	—	—	Non-album singles
"—" denotes a recording that did not chart or was not released in that territory.

Awards and achievements
Preceded by Aisel with "X My Heart"	Azerbaijan in the Eurovision Song Contest; 2019	Succeeded by Efendi with "Cleopatra"
