= Mata Hari (Samira Efendi song) =

2021 song by Samira Efendi

Single by Efendi
- Released: 15 March 2021
- Length: 2:40
- Label: BMF
- Songwriters: Amy van der Wel; Luuk van Beers; Tony Cornelissen; Josh Earl

Efendi singles chronology
| "Cleopatra" (2020) | "Mata Hari" (2021) | "Damlalar" (2021) |

Music video
- "Mata Hari" on YouTube

Eurovision Song Contest 2021 entry
- Country: Azerbaijan
- Artist: Samira Efendi
- Composers: Amy van der Wel; Josh Earl; Tony Cornelissen; Luuk van Beers
- Lyricists: Amy van der Wel; Josh Earl; Tony Cornelissen; Luuk van Beers

Finals performance
- Semi-final result: 8th
- Semi-final points: 138
- Final result: 20th
- Final points: 65

Entry chronology
- ◄ "Cleopatra" (2020)
- "Fade to Black" (2022) ►

"Mata Hari" is a song sung by Azerbaijani singer Efendi. The song represented Azerbaijan in the Eurovision Song Contest 2021 in Rotterdam, the Netherlands.

== Eurovision Song Contest ==
=== Internal selection ===
On 20 March 2020, Azerbaijani state broadcaster İTV confirmed that Efendi would represent Azerbaijan in the 2021 contest. A teaser for "Mata Hari" was released on 11 March 2021 on the official Eurovision YouTube channel.

=== At Eurovision ===
The 65th edition of the Eurovision Song Contest took place in Rotterdam, the Netherlands and consisted of two semi-finals on 18 May and 20 May 2021, and the grand final on 22 May 2021. According to the Eurovision rules, all participating countries, except the host nation and the "Big Five", consisting of France, Germany, Italy, Spain and the United Kingdom, are required to qualify from one of two semi-finals to compete for the final, although the top 10 countries from the respective semi-final progress to the grand final. On 17 November 2020, it was announced that Azerbaijan would be performing in the second half of the first semi-final of the contest.

== Charts ==
Chart performance for "Mata Hari"
| Chart (2021) | Peak position |
|---|---|
| Belgium (Ultratip Bubbling Under Flanders) | 6 |
| Greece (IFPI) | 6 |
| Iceland (Tónlistinn) | 25 |
| Lithuania (AGATA) | 18 |
| Netherlands (Single Top 100) | 44 |
| Norway (VG-lista) | 21 |
| Sweden (Sverigetopplistan) | 47 |
| UK Singles Downloads (OCC) | 64 |

== See also ==
- Mata Hari (Anne-Karine Strøm song)
