= Samira Efendi =

Azerbaijani singer (born 1991)

Samira Efendi Samirə Əfəndi
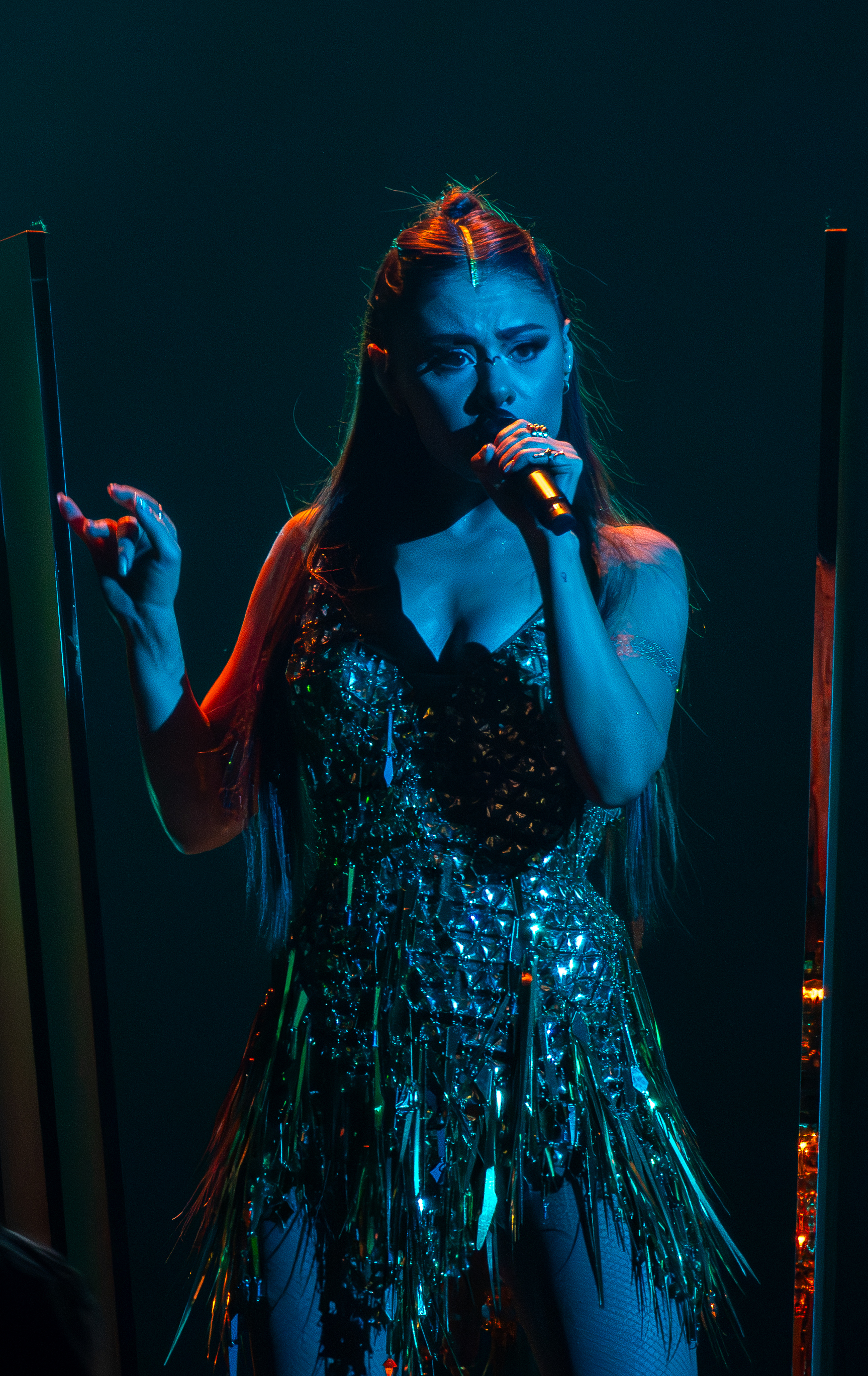
- Efendi in 2025

Background information
- Born: Samira Azer gizi Efendiyeva; 17 April 1991 (age 35); Baku, Republic of Azerbaijan, USSR
- Genres: Pop; jazz
- Occupation: Singer
- Years active: 2009–present

Samira Azer gizi Efendiyeva (Azerbaijani: Samirə Azər qızı Əfəndiyeva; born 17 April 1991), known as Samira Efendi or Efendi, is an Azerbaijani singer. She represented Azerbaijan in the Eurovision Song Contest 2021 with the song "Mata Hari".

== Career ==
=== Early career ===
Efendiyeva gained popularity in her home country after participating in the singing competitions Yeni Ulduz (2009), Böyük Səhnə (2014) and The Voice of Azerbaijan (2015-2016, third place). In 2017, she was the Azerbaijani representative in the international singing competition Silk Way Star, staged in Almaty, Kazakhstan, finishing in third place. Efendiyeva represented her country again at the Voice of Nur-Sultan festival held in Nur-Sultan, Kazakhstan in 2019.

In 2014, she participated in Azerbaijan's national selection for the Eurovision Song Contest but was eliminated at the third heat of the competition.

=== 2020–present: Eurovision Song Contest ===
On 28 February 2020, the Azerbaijani broadcaster İTV announced that Efendiyeva had been internally selected to represent Azerbaijan in the Eurovision Song Contest 2020 with the song "Cleopatra", held in Rotterdam, Netherlands. However, the contest was cancelled on 18 March 2020 due to the COVID-19 pandemic. She instead represented Azerbaijan in the Eurovision Song Contest 2021 with the song "Mata Hari". Efendi qualified to the final, where she ended up in 20th place out of 26 countries, receiving 65 points.

During her time at the Eurovision Song Contest, she would gain publicity after the Norwegian singer that had been selected to go to the contest, Andreas Haukeland, otherwise known as Tix had shown a noticeable crush on Efendi throughout their time at Eurovision through a variety of ways, including giving gifts, flirting on social media, asking Efendi out on dates, and singing love songs (including a couple parodies, Tix's own song Fallen Angel and the Pokémon Indigo League theme song). In response, she would do the same, including releasing a new music video and song dedicated to Tix that was posted by Eurovision's YouTube account. Some have accused Tix of fabricating the crush as a ploy to gain televotes from Azerbaijan, however Tix maintains that the crush is real and not for PR. Some others would create fan art, memes, and spread moments of the two recorded online on social media. A ship name was created, with it being called "Efentix." Tix would eventually qualify, finishing in tenth, five points ahead of the next opponent. Azerbaijan would give 10 points to Norway in the semi-final. It is unclear whether they are in a relationship, however Efendi has been reported to have been thinking of potentially marrying Haukeland. Samira would say of the relationship "To be honest, at first I was not serious about the attention of the Norwegian representative Tix. I didn’t understand what was happening. I went to Eurovision to win, not to meet someone. I went there with completely different thoughts, but received a gift from fate."

In 2025, Efendi returned to Eurovision, to perform "Cleopatra" as a part of the interval act in the second semi-final of the 2025 contest, alongside other 2020 contestants Gjon's Tears, the Roop, and Destiny who were unable to perform their original songs due to the pandemic.

== Personal life ==
Efendi has been rumored to have been dating Norwegian russ music artist Andreas Haukeland, otherwise known by his artist name, Tix. While speaking to Sputnik Azerbaijan, she talked about potentially marrying Haukeland, and saying that she would move to Norway to be with him, saying (translated to English) "If I get married, I’ll probably move to Norway. Where the husband is, there I am."

Efendi has practiced pole dancing for a number of years. In her spare time, she runs her own sweets boutique, called Efendi Sweet. The online Instagram store sells a variety of sweets, including cakes and éclairs.

== Discography ==
=== Singles ===
Title	Year	Peak chart positions				Album
Title	Year	NLD	NOR	SWE	UK Down.	Album
"Yarımın yarı"	2019	—	—	—	—	Non-album singles
"Sən gələndə"	2019	—	—	—	—	Non-album singles
"Yol ayrıcı"	2019	—	—	—	—	Non-album singles
"Cleopatra"	2020	—	—	—	—	Non-album singles
"Mata Hari"	2021	44	21	47	64	Non-album singles
"Damlalar"	2021	—	—	—	—	Non-album singles
"Being a Woman"	2022	—	—	—	—	Non-album singles
"Efendi" (with MadTeen)	2022	—	—	—	—	Non-album singles
"Doğma diyarım"	2023	—	—	—	—	Non-album singles
"—" denotes a recording that did not chart or was not released in that territory.

Awards and achievements
Preceded by Chingiz with "Truth"	Azerbaijan in the Eurovision Song Contest; 2020 (cancelled)	Succeeded by Herself with "Mata Hari"
Preceded by Herself with "Cleopatra"	Azerbaijan in the Eurovision Song Contest; 2021	Succeeded by Nadir Rustamli with "Fade to Black"
