= Cleopatra (Samira Efendi song) =

2020 song by Samira Efendi

Single by Samira Efendi
- Released: 10 March 2020
- Length: 3:00
- Label: BMF
- Songwriter(s): Luuk van Beers; Alan Roy Scott; Sarah Lake
- Producer(s): Luuk van Beers; Tony Cornelissen

Samira Efendi singles chronology
"Yol Ayrıcı" (2019)	"Cleopatra" (2020)	"Mata Hari" (2021)

Eurovision Song Contest 2020 entry
- Country: Azerbaijan
- Artist(s): Samira Efendi
- Languages: English
- Composer(s): Luuk van Beers; Alan Roy Scott; Sarah Lake
- Lyricist(s): Luuk van Beers; Alan Roy Scott; Sarah Lake

Finals performance
- Semi-final result: Contest cancelled

Entry chronology
- ◄ "Truth" (2019)
- "Mata Hari" (2021) ►

"Cleopatra" is a song recorded by Azerbaijani singer Samira Efendi. It would have represented Azerbaijan in the Eurovision Song Contest 2020 if the 2020 contest was not cancelled due to COVID-19 pandemic. The song was written by Luuk van Beers, Alan Roy Scott and Sarah Lake, and employs the refrain "Nam Myōhō Renge Kyō", which is a central mantra of Nichiren Buddhism.

== Background ==
The song was originally written at Las Negras camps in Spain, by Sarah Lake, Alan Roy Scott and Luuk Van Beers, under the guidance and A & R direction of former UK, BBC, Music Consultant, Greig Watts. Once the final demo was complete, Publishers, Greig Watts from Dwb Music and Kevin Lee, from Wii Bii Music, engaged in finding the perfect home for the song. The track was originally submitted to San Marino RTV and a demo was recorded by Senhit, but the composers withdrew the song from the Sammarinese selection.

Once it was agreed that the song would be Azerbaijan's Eurovision entry, Tony Cornellisen and Luuk Van Beers travelled to Baku, to record Efendi, and produce the final version of the track.

The song features three traditional Azerbaijani instruments, an oud, a balaban and a tar. When talking about the song, Efendi said, "Cleopatra is a song about trusting your gut instinct, standing up for yourself and being a “queen” - even when things get tough and especially if someone betrays or hurts you. It is truly a song about freedom."

The song earned widespread praise amongst fans for the lyric "Cleopatra was a queen like me/Straight or Gay or in between", despite LGBT rights being a taboo subject in Azerbaijan.

== Eurovision Song Contest ==
The song was due to represent Azerbaijan in the Eurovision Song Contest 2020, after Samira Efendi was internally selected by the Azerbaijani broadcaster, İctimai Television (İTV), and was going to be performed in one of the two semi-finals. On 28 January 2020, a special allocation draw was held which placed each country into one of the two semi-finals, as well as which half of the show they would perform in. Azerbaijan was placed into the first semi-final, to be held on 12 May 2020, and was scheduled to perform in the second half of the show. However, due to the COVID-19 pandemic, the Contest was cancelled.

== Music video ==
A music video to accompany the release of "Cleopatra" was first released onto YouTube on 10 March 2020. The music video was filmed in Azerbaijan at the Gobustan National Park.
