= Truth (Chingiz song) =

2019 song by Chingiz

Single by Chingiz
- Released: 8 March 2019
- Length: 3:29
- Label: BMF
- Songwriters: Boris Milanov; Chingiz

Chingiz singles chronology
"Tənha gəzən" (2019)	"Truth" (2019)	"Vetenim kimiyem" (2020)

Eurovision Song Contest 2019 entry
- Country: Azerbaijan
- Artist: Chingiz
- Language: English
- Composers: Borislav Milanov; Chingiz Mustafayev; Trey Campbell; Pablo Dinero; Hostess; Bo J (Joacim Persson)
- Lyricists: Borislav Milanov; Trey Campbell; Pablo Dinero; Hostess; Bo J (Joacim Persson)

Finals performance
- Semi-final result: 5th
- Semi-final points: 224
- Final result: 8th
- Final points: 302

Entry chronology
- ◄ "X My Heart" (2018)
- "Cleopatra" (2020) ►

"Truth" is a song by Azerbaijani singer Chingiz Mustafayev. It represented Azerbaijan at the Eurovision Song Contest 2019 in Tel Aviv, Israel. It was performed during the second semi-final held on 16 May 2019, and qualified for the final, where it finished in eighth place with 302 points.

== Eurovision Song Contest ==
The song was chosen to represent Azerbaijan in the Eurovision Song Contest 2019, after Chingiz was internally selected by the Azerbaijani broadcaster. On 28 January 2019, a special allocation draw was held which placed each country into one of the two semi-finals, as well as which half of the show they would perform in. Azerbaijan was placed into the second semi-final, to be held on 16 May 2019, and was scheduled to perform in the second half of the show. Once all the competing songs for the 2019 contest had been released, the running order for the semi-finals was decided by the show's producers rather than through another draw, so that similar songs were not placed next to each other. Azerbaijan performed in position 18, and qualified for the final. It finished in eighth place with 302 points.

== Charts ==
Chart (2019)	Peak position
Estonia (Eesti Tipp-40)	31
Greece International Digital Singles (IFPI)	100
Lithuania (AGATA)	10
Scottish Singles Sales (Official Charts)	49
Sweden (Sverigetopplistan)	91
Switzerland (Schweizer Hitparade)	43
UK Singles Downloads (Official Charts)	35
